= Tape bias =

Technique that improves the fidelity of analogue tape recorders

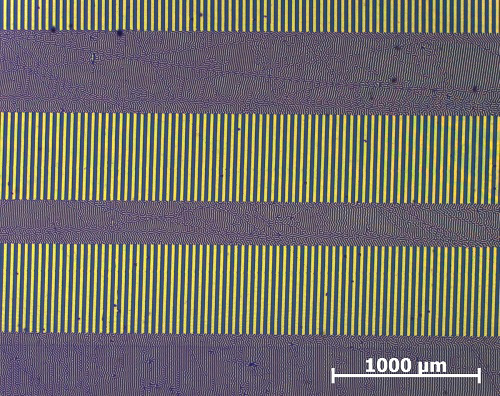
Visualization of the magnetic field on a stereo cassette containing a 1 kHz audio tone. Individual high-frequency magnetic domains are visible.

Tape bias is the term for two techniques, AC bias and DC bias, that improve the fidelity of analogue tape recorders. DC bias is the addition of direct current to the audio signal that is being recorded. AC bias is the addition of an inaudible high-frequency signal (generally from 40 to 150 kHz) to the audio signal. Most contemporary tape recorders use AC bias.

When recording, magnetic tape has a nonlinear response as determined by its coercivity. Without bias, this response results in poor performance, especially at low signal levels. A recording signal that generates a magnetic field strength less than the tape's coercivity cannot magnetise the tape and produces little playback signal. Bias increases the signal quality of most audio recordings significantly by pushing the signal into more linear zones of the tape's magnetic transfer function.

== History ==
Magnetic recording was proposed as early as 1878 by Oberlin Smith, who on 4 October 1878 filed, with the U.S. patent office, a caveat regarding the magnetic recording of sound and who published his ideas on the subject in the 8 September 1888 issue of The Electrical World as "Some possible forms of phonograph". By 1898, Valdemar Poulsen had demonstrated a magnetic recorder and proposed magnetic tape. Fritz Pfleumer was granted a German patent for a non-magnetic "Sound recording carrier" with a magnetic coating, on 1 January 1928. Years earlier, Joseph O'Neil had created a similar recording medium, yet had not made a working machine that could record sound.

=== DC bias ===
The earliest magnetic recording systems simply applied the unadulterated (baseband) input signal to a recording head, resulting in recordings with poor low-frequency response and high distortion. Within short order, the addition of a suitable direct current to the signal, a DC bias, was found to reduce distortion by operating the tape substantially within its linear-response region. The principal disadvantage of DC bias was that it left the tape with a net magnetization, which generated significant noise on replay because of the grain of the tape particles. However: the earlier wire recorders were largely immune to the problem due to their high running speed and relatively large wire size. Some early DC-bias systems used a permanent magnet that was placed near the record head. It had to be swung out of the way for replay. DC bias was replaced by AC bias but was later re-adopted by some very low-cost cassette recorders.

=== AC bias ===
The original patent for AC bias was filed by Wendell L. Carlson and Glenn L. Carpenter in 1921, eventually resulting in a patent in 1927. The value of AC bias was somewhat masked by the fact that wire recording gained little benefit from the technique and Carlson and Carpenter's achievement was largely ignored. The first rediscovery seems to have been by Dean Wooldridge at Bell Telephone Laboratories, around 1937, but their lawyers found the original patent, and Bell simply kept silent about their rediscovery of AC bias.

Teiji Igarashi, Makoto Ishikawa, and Kenzo Nagai of Japan published a paper on AC biasing in 1938 and received a Japanese patent in 1940. Marvin Camras (USA) also rediscovered high-frequency (AC) bias independently in 1941 and received a patent in 1944.

The reduction in distortion and noise provided by AC bias was accidentally rediscovered in 1940 by Walter Weber while working at the Reichs-Rundfunk-Gesellschaft (RRG) when a DC-biased Magnetophon that he had been working on developed an 'unwanted' oscillation in its record circuitry.

The last production DC biased Magnetophon machines had harmonic distortion in excess of 10 percent; a dynamic range of 40 dB and a frequency response of just 50 Hz to 6 kHz at a tape speed slightly in excess of 30 inches per second (76.8 cm/sec). The AC biased Magnetophon machines reduced the harmonic distortion to well under 3 percent; extended the dynamic range to 65 dB and the frequency response was now from 40 Hz to 15 kHz at the same tape speed. These AC biased magnetophons provided a fidelity of recording that outperformed any other recording system of the time.

== See also ==
- Barkhausen effect
- Dither
- Hysteresis
