= Walter Weber =

Walter Weber may refer to:

- Walter A. Weber (1906–1979), American illustrator and naturalist
- Wally Weber (1903–1984), American football player and coach
- Walter Weber (cricketer) (1879–1941), Guyanese cricketer
- Walter Weber (engineer) (1907–1944), German audio engineer involved with tape bias research
