= Richard H. Ranger =

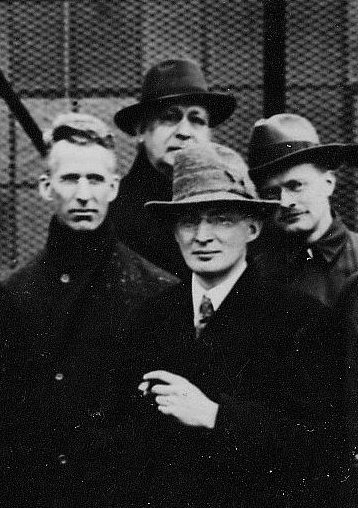
Scientists attending a tour of the RCA Brunswick wireless station, 1921. Left to right: Albert W. Hull (GE), E.B. Pillsbury (RCA), Saul Dushman (GE), Richard H. Ranger (RCA).

Richard Howland Ranger (13 June 1889 – 10 January 1962) was an American electrical engineer, music engineer and inventor. He was born in Indianapolis, Indiana, the son of John Hilliard and Emily Anthen Gillet Ranger, He served in the U.S. Army Signal Corps during World War I, earning the rank of Major. After the war, he attended the Massachusetts Institute of Technology (MIT) from 1919 to 1923.

== Biography ==
As a designer for the Radio Corporation of America (RCA), in 1924, Richard Ranger invented the wireless photoradiogram, or transoceanic radio facsimile, the forerunner of today's fax machines. A photograph of President Calvin Coolidge sent from New York to London in November 1924 became the first photo picture reproduced by transoceanic radio facsimile. Commercial use of Ranger's product began two years later.

In 1930, he formed a company, Rangertone, Inc., in Newark, New Jersey. The company, which marketed the electronic 'Rangertone Organ', was sold after his death, and remains privately owned as Rangertone Research, Inc.

In 1932, he invented the NBC chime machine, an automatic device to reproduce the familiar hand-struck NBC chimes used by the National Broadcasting Company (NBC) radio network. By connecting his electrically operated chimes with outdoor loudspeakers, he was later able to create the effect of church bells. He also did other work relating to electronic organs.

During World War II, he returned to the U.S. Army Signal Corps as a Colonel and was put in charge of radar and communications at the Radio and Radar Test Labs in Orlando, Florida. He later went to Europe as part of Field information Agency, Technical, an investigative team between 1944 and 1946 to examine German advances in electronics and wrote a series of technical reports on electrical components, communications, television, and (most significantly) magnetic tape recording.

After the war, Ranger's work led to further development of magnetic tape recorders. He developed a product using the German technology, and demonstrated it to potential users, including the members of the Institute of Radio Engineers, the National Broadcasting Company, the Radio Corporation of America, the American Institute of Electrical Engineers, and individuals like singer Bing Crosby.

His subsequent refinements led to improved synchronization of sound and visual portions of films. The Academy of Motion Picture Arts and Sciences presented Ranger with an Oscar in 1956 for his development of the tape recorder and synchronization of film and sound.

Richard H. Ranger was inducted into the New Jersey Inventors Hall of Fame in 1997.

== See also ==
- Jack Mullin - Another magnetic tape pioneer in America.
- John Herbert Orr - Another magnetic tape pioneer in America.
