= Pavek Museum of Broadcasting =

Pavek Museum
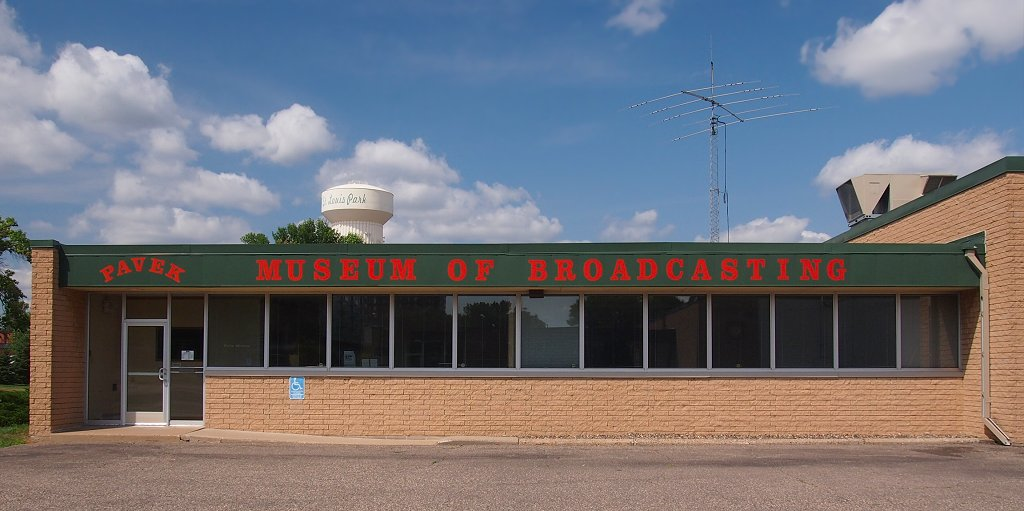
- Established: 29 October 1988
- Location: St. Louis Park, Minnesota
- Coordinates: 44°56′21″N 93°20′37″W
- Type: Telecommunications museum
- Founders: Joe Pavek, Earl Bakken, Paul Hedberg
- Website: www.pavekmuseum.org

The Pavek Museum is a museum in St. Louis Park, Minnesota, that has one of the world's most significant collections of vintage radio and television equipment. It originated in the collection of Joe Pavek, who began collecting unique radios while he was an instructor at the Dunwoody Institute in 1946. Students then were given old radios to disassemble, and Pavek was concerned about what might be destroyed in the process.

== History ==
Pavek's collection expanded through the 1970s, when he looked for someone to take over for him. He had difficulty finding anyone and was about to auction off the collection in 1984 when Earl Bakken stepped in. Bakken, the founder of Medtronic and the inventor of the first wearable pacemaker, had also spent many years fixing old radios and TVs, and shared Pavek's passion for vintage hardware. The two joined Paul Hedberg of the Minnesota Broadcasters Association in creating a nonprofit organization that would be the new museum's parent. The Pavek Museum opened on October 29, 1988, a day that was honored with a proclamation by Governor Rudy Perpich as "Joe Pavek Day."

Pavek died a year later, and Bakken assumed leadership of the organization. In 1990 the collection was greatly expanded with the addition of the collection of John T. "Jack" Mullin, an Army Signal Corps veteran of World War II who had brought some AEG Magnetophon tape recorders back from Germany. Mullin used them to record Bing Crosby's radio programs, the first use of magnetic tape in American broadcasting. Over the years, he acquired other recording devices and eventually amassed a world-renowned collection.

The museum has offered educational courses since its founding, both for children and adults.

== See also ==
- Museum of Broadcast Communications
- Museum of Radio and Technology
- Paley Center for Media
- Radio Hall of Fame
- Museum of Broadcast Technology in Woonsocket, Rhode Island
