= Museum of broadcasting =

Museum of Broadcasting may refer to:

- The Paley Center for Media
- Museum of Broadcast Communications
- Pavek Museum of Broadcasting
