= Saul Dushman =

Physical chemist

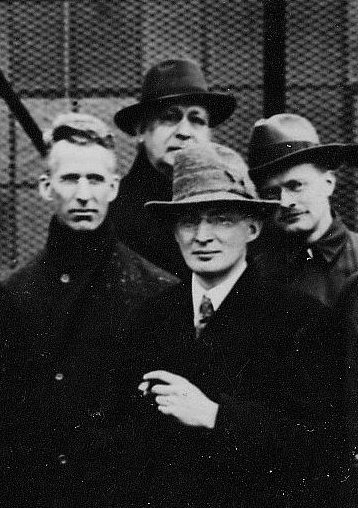
- Scientists attending a tour of the RCA Brunswick wireless station, 1921. Left to right: Albert W. Hull (GE), E.B. Pillsbury (RCA), Saul Dushman (GE), Richard H. Ranger (RCA).
- Born: July 12, 1883; Rostov, Russian Empire
- Died: July 7, 1954 (aged 70); Scotia, New York, United States

Saul Dushman (July 12, 1883 – July 7, 1954) was a Russian-American physical chemist.

Dushman was born on July 12, 1883, in Rostov, Russia; he immigrated to the United States in 1891. He received a doctorate from the University of Toronto in 1912. That year, he joined the Research Laboratory of General Electric Company (GE). He would work at GE for the rest of his career except for a 1922-1925 stint as the Research Division director at Edison Lamp Works. His main research interests were quantum mechanics, electromotive force, atomic structure, electron emission, unimolecular force, and high vacuum, and he authored several standard science textbooks.

His textbook "Scientific Foundations of Vacuum Technique" (1922 and 1949) is a classic covering vacuum design principles. This book and the later editions are still in use today. It was completely revised in 1961 by his colleague James Lafferty.

His research on thermionic emission is remembered in the form of the Richardson-Dushman equation.

He died in Scotia, New York.
