= NBC chimes =

Trademark jingle used by NBC

NBC chimes
The three notes of the NBC chimes.

The NBC chimes are a sequence of three tones played on National Broadcasting Company (NBC) broadcasts. Originally developed in 1927 as seven notes, they were standardized to the current three-note version by the early 1930s, and possibly as early as 1929. The chimes were originally employed as an audible programming cue, used to alert network control engineers and the announcers at NBC's radio network affiliates. They soon became associated with NBC programming in general, and are an early example of an "interval signal" used to help establish a broadcaster's identity with its audience.

In 1950 the NBC chimes became the first "purely audio" service mark granted by the U.S. Patent and Trademark Office. They continue to be used as an audio signature by the NBC TV network and its affiliates, and also on the NBC Sports Radio network and at the opening of the hourly NBC News Radio broadcasts.

== Definition ==
Musical notation for the "G_{3} E_{4} C_{4}"
NBC chimes sequence

The NBC chimes sound mark is currently assigned to NBCUniversal Media, LLC. Its official description, as recorded by its registration at the U.S. Patent and Trademark Office, is:

The mark comprises a sequence of chime-like musical notes which are in the key of C and sound the notes G, E, C, the "G" being the one just below middle C, the "E" the one just above middle C, and the "C" being middle C, thereby to identify applicant's broadcasting service.

== History ==
While general information about the origin of the NBC chimes is well documented, precise details about the earliest developments are not as clear, and in some cases researchers have come to differing conclusions. It is particularly difficult to establish exactly when the initial, longer, versions were pared down to the final three-tone sequence.

=== "General Electric Company" folklore ===
A commonly suggested explanation for the chimes' "G-E-C" sequence is that it comes from the initials of the General Electric Company (GE). In 1987, Robert C. Wright, the president and C.E.O. of NBC, testified before the U.S. Congress that "Not everyone knows that GE was one of the original founders of RCA, NBC's former parent, and that the notes of the famous NBC chimes are G-E-C, standing for the General Electric Company." References to this purported link date back to at least 1945. However, this was over a decade after the NBC chimes were adopted, and NBC's own early historical reviews make no mention of this supposed origin.

In 1919, General Electric founded NBC's parent company, the Radio Corporation of America (RCA). At the time the NBC chimes were being developed, GE was still RCA's largest shareholder and also held 30% of NBC's stock. As part of an antitrust case settlement, in late 1932 GE agreed to relinquish its RCA and NBC holdings. Fifty-four years later, RCA was repurchased and made defunct by GE, which rechristened the RCA Building to the "GE Building", and later the "Comcast Building" after GE divested itself of NBC. The small handheld chimes commonly used when the NBC chime sequence was being developed had only four tones: G, F, C and E. Given these limited choices, it was most likely only a coincidence that the adopted sequence matched GE's initials, and while useful as a mnemonic for remembering the notes' correct sequence, there is little evidence actually supporting any link.

=== Early radio station audio signatures ===
Because radio is sound oriented, it was a natural development for stations to independently adopt a variety of audio signatures, which in some cases took the form of chimes. Examples existed from the earliest days of organized broadcasting, including at least three by the summer of 1923:

- WSB in Atlanta, Georgia claims it was the first station to sound a musical identification at the end of programs, using a four-bar xylophone given to station manager Lambdin Kay by a performer, Nell Pendly. A three note signature, E-G-C, was developed, based on the first three notes from the chorus of the World War One classic "Over There".
- WHAS in Louisville, Kentucky. Station manager Credo Fitch Harris, who wrote in his memoir "what devil put the idea in my head to begin with, may never be known", in 1922 had eight metal chime bars constructed so that he could play — "with fear and trembling, lest the do-dad I struck with hit the wrong thing" — the chorus of "My Old Kentucky Home" at station sign-offs.
- KFI in Los Angeles, California. The caption on a 1923 photograph of the station's studio mentioned the "electric chimes which open and close the program".

=== Introduction of the NBC chimes ===
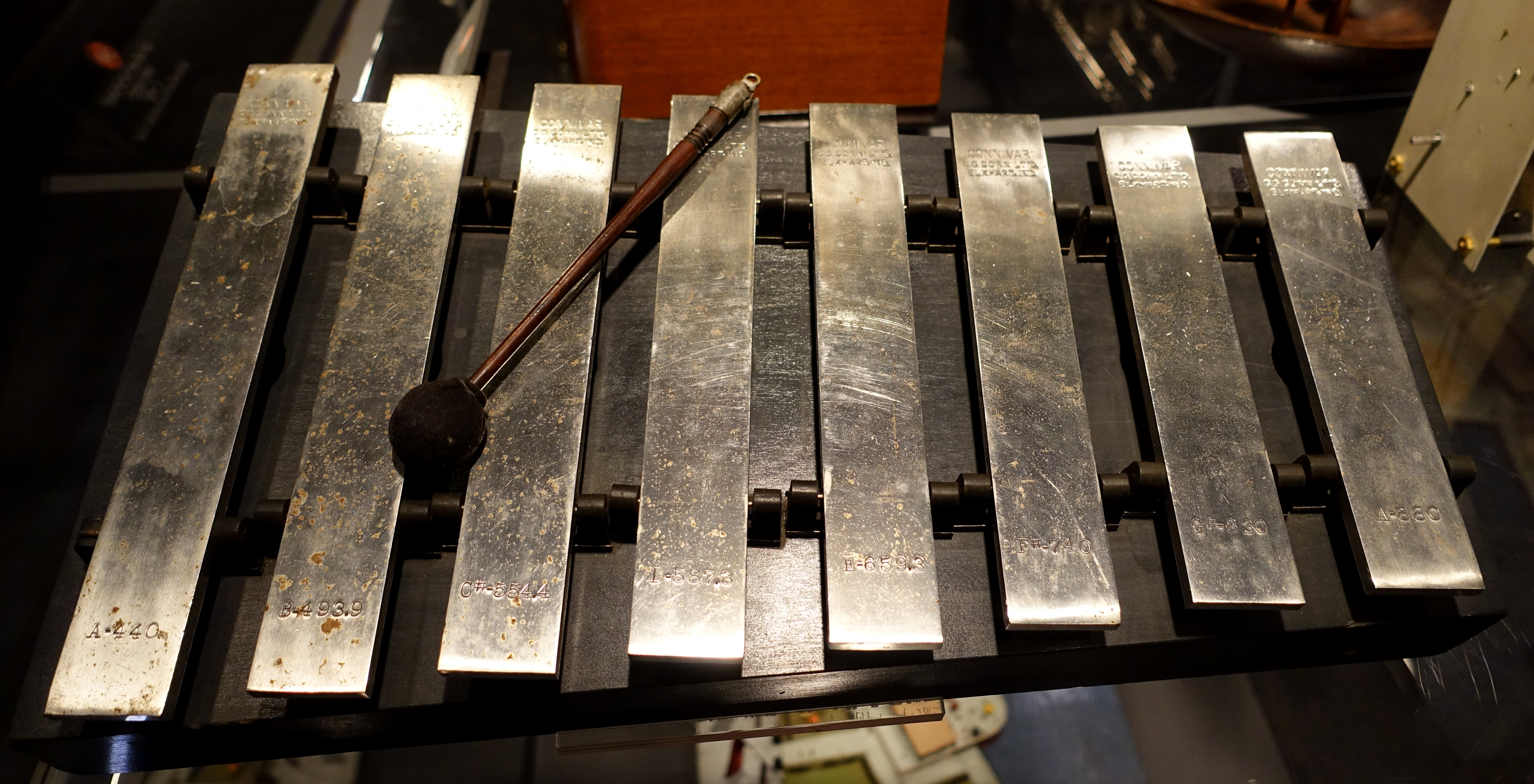
Although NBC normally used four-bar Deagan Company chimes, WMAQ in Chicago used a glockenspiel to play the notes (c. 1930).

What differentiated the NBC chimes from these earlier identifying sounds, at least in the beginning, is their use for network communications and coordination. Later they would also become a signature sound representing the network, but their primary initial purpose was to help ensure smooth network operations. In 1932, NBC stated that: "The purpose of the chimes... is to synchronize local station identification announcements and to serve as a cue to engineers at relay points all over the country to switch various branches of the networks on or off as the programs change every 15 minutes." This reflected the organization of the network schedule, which was divided into 15 minute program blocks. In addition, effective May 11, 1927, the Federal Radio Commission's General Order No. 8 specified that each station was "directed to announce its call letters and location... not less than once during each 15 minutes of transmission". The use of the NBC chimes as network switching cues eventually allowed the network to save money on infrastructure costs. Until 1933 it was common practice to run a second line that used telegraphic signalling to provide networking communication. After that date the normal policy was to eliminate this second line and send the networking cues over the program lines.

Information about the early development of the NBC chimes is very sparse, although work began shortly after the first NBC network broadcast on November 15, 1926. A 1950 internal NBC memo, "NBC Chimes: First Use of the famous NBC Chimes", states that "The use of chimes for identifying NBC was first conceived by Phillips Carlin," and this memo has a timeline entry for December 22, 1926 that states: "Chimes purchased from Lesch Co for $48.50". Phillips Carlin was a well-known NBC announcer, who had experience employing chimes in radio broadcasts dating back to at least 1924. At that time he was the announcer for the Silvertown Chimes program, which was broadcast over the "WEAF chain" network originating in New York City. (WEAF was owned by the American Telephone & Telegraph Company (AT&T). In 1927, after the RCA bought out AT&T's radio operations, the WEAF chain was reorganized as the NBC Red Network.) A contemporary review of this show noted that each program opened with "the soft ringing of chimes", followed by Carlin's announcement that "The Silvertown Chimes have rung out their greeting. Each week they have announced an hour of music, a program of dance so delightful that it drives all thoughts of care away."

A 1942 NBC account of the origin of the chimes gave additional credit for their refinement to NBC chief engineer O. B. Hanson and Ernest LaPrade, an NBC orchestra leader. This account also states that there was an ongoing evolution during the developmental period, as the chime sequence originally consisted of seven notes, which, according to Ernest LaPrade, proved difficult to play correctly, so the sequence was shortened to five, then four, and finally three notes. The notes were manually played on four-bar chime sets manufactured by the J.C. Deagan Company of Chicago. Additional reports state that the initial sequence was G-C-F-E-G-C-E, which became G-C-G-E and then just G-E-C. November 29, 1929 is sometimes reported to be the date that the three-tone sequence was adopted; however, the longer intervals were still in use until 1931, according to surviving network recordings.

The use of signalling tones to indicate the end of a program would be unique to the NBC networks. The CBS Radio network, founded in 1927, never adopted anything similar, instead keying its network switching to the standard phrase "This is the Columbia Broadcasting System". Initially NBC had two national networks, the NBC Red Network and the NBC Blue Network, however the Federal Communications Commission (FCC) was unhappy with this and worked to eliminate the common ownership. In late 1942 Phillips Carlin became vice president of programming at the soon-to-be independent Blue network, which later became the American Broadcasting Company (ABC). One of his first decisions was whether to adopt "a new set of chimes (as distinguished from the NBC chimes now in use)", and the choice was to instead end their use on the Blue network. However, the remaining NBC network operations considered the chimes to be an important part of their corporate identity. In 1942, NBC estimated that the average listener heard the tones 16 times a day, while annually there were nearly 20 billion impressions worldwide.

=== Additional origin explanations ===
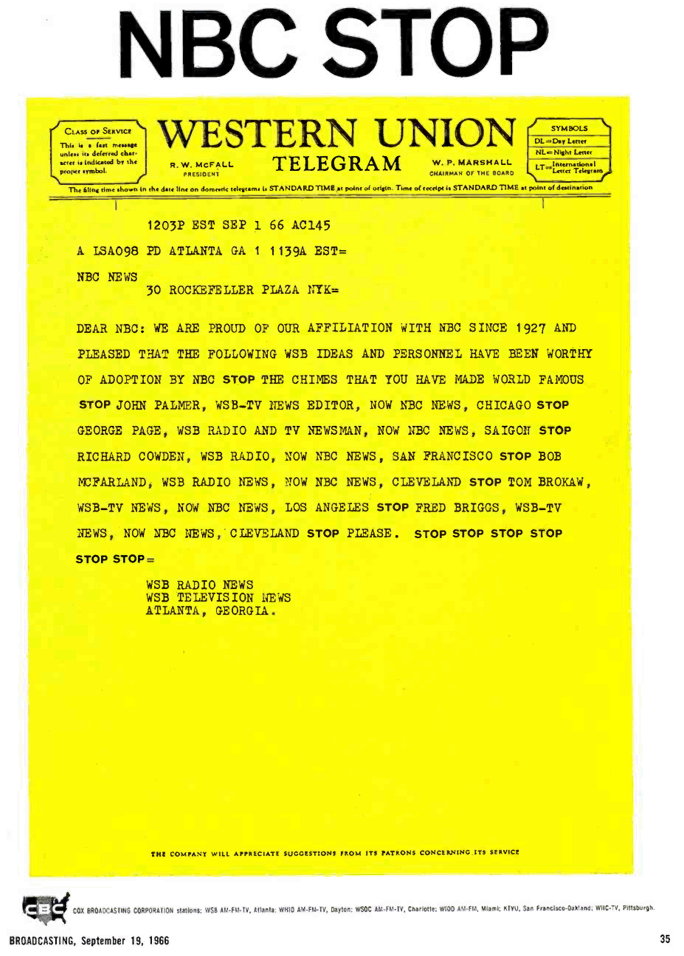
1966 WSB advertisement included the claim the idea for the NBC chimes had originated there.

Once the NBC chimes became established, a few claimants appeared who stated they were the original inspiration for the practice. However, like the earliest days of the NBC chimes history, there is very little information available to evaluate these claims.

- One assertion is that the three notes really did stand for "General Electric Company", because it had been the practice to play the keys G-E-C on a piano at WGY, a GE-owned station in Schenectady, New York.
- A further claim for WSB in Atlanta is that, in addition to being the first station to adopt a three-chime signature, it was directly responsible for NBC's chimes. This explanation states that, as an NBC affiliate, WSB was hosting a network broadcast of a Georgia Tech college football game, and NBC staff at the network's New York City headquarters heard the WSB chimes, which prompted them to ask permission to adopt it for use by the national networks.

=== Rangertone chime machine ===
The original chimes were played by hand by the announcers, which led to occasional errors and undesirable variations. In 1932 a standardized "chimeless chime", which promised to play the notes consistently — one reviewer commented that "there will be no more sour notes from those NBC chimes". — was developed by Richard H. Ranger, a former RCA engineer who had invented an electronic organ. Ranger's creation was a music box-style electro-mechanical device, which played the three-note sequence at the push of a button.

The initial installation was made at New York City headquarters, and went into operation on September 18, 1932. Following successful tests, the network ordered multiple additional units, which were distributed to major sites throughout the United States, including Los Angeles, New York City, Chicago and San Francisco (which had two machines, a main one and a backup). About a dozen of the Ranger units are estimated to have been constructed, a few of which survive in collections. Around 1941 the Rangertone devices started to be replaced with an all-electronic system developed by NBC engineers. By the mid-1980s, these dedicated devices had been replaced by a magnetic tape cartridge recording of a chimes machine that was played back as needed.

=== The "fourth chime" ===
The "fourth chime" was a variation of the standard three-segment version, which repeated the closing "C" chime, to become "G-E-C-C". It was initially adopted as a paging method for the New York City area, summoning employees listening at home to report for work at NBC headquarters in order to assist with an important developing story. However, as knowledge of the signal's meaning spread, it also became a way to notify affiliate stations and knowledgeable listeners of pending urgent programming. The "fourth chime" was first used in 1937 in response to the Hindenburg disaster, and saw a majority of its use during World War II. A different variation was also used during World War II, with the chimes being "B-D-G-G". An NBC account of its employment at the start of the "D-day" invasion on June 6, 1944, stated: "At 2:30 a.m. the network was put on 'flash' basis; the NBC four-chime-alert calling all newsmen and commentators to their microphones, key operating personnel to their stations, sounded from the newsroom control room."

There are very few recorded examples of fourth chime transmissions. Although NBC publicity, and some of the contemporary recordings, agree that the "fourth chime" sequence merely repeated a "C" at the end, some of the other recorded examples, although composed of 4 tones, have pitches that appear to be significantly different. The use of the "fourth chime" ended shortly after the close of World War II.

=== Service Mark registration ===
Prior to 1946, U.S. law limited registered trademarks to tangible goods. The law was changed that year to allow "service marks" for offered services, and, in an application made with the U.S. Patent Office on November 20, 1947, NBC filed for service mark protection for use of its chimes in conjunction with the "broadcasting of radio programs". Notification of the pending application, which stated that the chimes had been in use since November 1927, was published by the Patent Office on January 17, 1950. There were no objections raised, so on April 4, 1950 the three notes of the NBC chimes became an officially registered service mark.

It is sometimes incorrectly stated that this was the first grant of a U.S. service mark. Actually, numerous earlier service marks had been approved, but previously they had been logos or descriptive names for the service being provided. What made the NBC chimes grant unique was that this was the first time that a service — in this case NBC's radio broadcasts — was granted protection for the use of a service mark that was a "purely audible" trademark, or what became known as a "sound mark".

The original radio broadcasting "sound mark" registration expired on November 3, 1992, after NBC Radio had become a content subsidiary of Westwood One. However, a second registration, made in 1971 and covering the "broadcasting of television programs", remains in force.

=== Later usage ===
NBC TV chimes logo for color broadcasts (1954–1959)

Although the Rangertone chime machines had to be manually triggered, in 1950 RCA reported that the chimes now normally "sound automatically at 30 seconds before the hour and 30 seconds before the half hour". A December 1953 report in The Billboard noted:

The NBC Radio chimes, trademark of the web for many years, will soon be trimmed from their traditional five seconds to three seconds. Thus they will conform with the timing of the chimes as aired by the NBC-TV web. The video network slashed the time quite a while back to give the affiliates 10 seconds instead of eight when the outlets began selling shared identifications to sponsors.

The use of the chimes as a network communications signal ended around 1971, the result of automation, which in the case of radio led to shorter tones and "chirps" that were commonly filtered out by the stations so they were unheard by listeners, and in the case of television included use of the vertical blanking interval to transmit cues that were not seen by viewers. However, subsequently there have been numerous examples of the chimes being used in NBC programming as an audio signature.

- In 1974, WNBC incorporated the sequence into the opening of its synthesized theme music for its local newscasts, NewsCenter 4 (sharpening the pitch by a half-step); the stinger was heard at the opens to the station's 5:00, 6:00 and 11:00 p.m. newscasts. Eventually, NBC Radio adopted WNBC-TV's NewsCenter 4 stinger as its top-of-the-hour news sounder. With alterations (and a brief interruption in the early 1990s), WNBC has used a form of the chimes on its newscasts ever since.
- The music used on NewsCenter 4, "NBC Radio-TV Newspulse" (composed by Fred Weinberg), was later used for NBC Nightly News in the 1970s and NBC News bulletins/special reports in the 1970s and 1980s. The usage of the NBC chimes continues in local newscasts on NBC stations to this day; in fact, many stations owned by or affiliated with the network play the chimes sequence during the extended forecast slide at the end of their newscasts' main weather segment.
- In 1976, the chimes were revived nationally in honor of NBC's 50th anniversary. Modern musical versions of the three-note chimes are still in popular use on the NBC radio and television networks (and are the opening and closing notes of the current version of the theme music for NBC Nightly News), as well as in the closing logo for NBCUniversal Syndication Studios, the television syndication arm of NBC's current immediate parent, NBCUniversal (the orchestral variant currently used by NBCUniversal Syndication Studios was first used in 1999 in the closing logo sequence for the NBC Studios production unit).
- From 1982 to the early 1990s, most voiceover promos heard during the end credits of NBC network shows would begin with the chimes. From 1982 to 1987, the chimes would blend into an instrumental version of the promotional slogan that NBC would be using at the time.
- Today made the chimes the centerpiece of its theme in 1978, resolving a legal dispute between the network and Stephen Schwartz, composer of Godspell. Schwartz felt that the Ray Ellis-penned closing theme Today, which had been used for the program since 1971 (and was also used as the show's opening theme starting in 1976), was lifted from the classic Godspell song "Day by Day". Using the chimes as his template, Ellis composed a new theme song, which stuck. Although Today has used a segment from John Williams' music package for NBC News, The Mission, since 1985, Ellis's revised composition has been used on and off during portions of Today ever since.
- NBC News uses a version of the original chimes for special breaking news reports that interrupt regular programming on the network and/or its stations (the tendency of this version to precede major events has earned this variant the nickname of the "Chimes of Doom").
- NBC's on-air promotions for the 2007–08 midseason lineup featured the chimes prominently alongside the new slogan "Chime In". Several used alternate versions tied to specific shows' themes: for example, ringing telephones for The Office; the ringing of cash registers for Deal or No Deal; and objects striking metal for America's Toughest Jobs. Similarly, the chimes have also been used for select promotions during the fall 2012 season.
- In 2018, NBC introduced an "NBC Presents" vanity card shown before their in-house programming, which uses the chimes.
- Used as a time check by Philippine station DZRH, with the three note chimes played before time check after idents were played. During its inception in the 1940s, this station was an NBC affiliate, as KZRH.

== Other uses ==
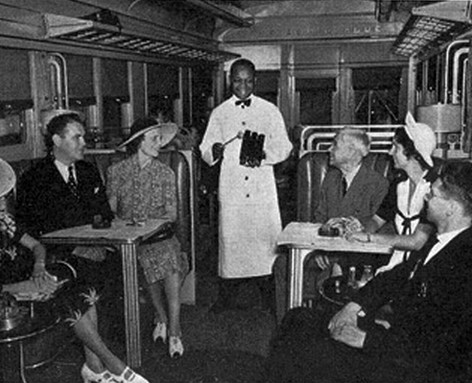
In 1938, NBC reached an agreement with the Baltimore and Ohio Railroad for B&O to use NBC's tones to summon rail passengers for meals

In 1938, NBC's Advertising and Promotions Director, E. P. H. James, made an agreement with NuTone Chimes of Cincinnati to provide chime sets for sale to the general public. The chimes were used in the dining cars for a few railroad and steamship company lines, starting with the Baltimore and Ohio and New York Central railroads. A line of toy chimes was also produced. That same year the network's fans could buy their own set of chimes from NBC for $2.95 each, with the suggested uses of "Call your family to dinner . . .signal your maid". 1938 also saw the installation of outdoor clocks, in New York City and Chicago, that rang the NBC chimes on-the-hour.

In the 1940 Disney animated short film Fire Chief starring Donald Duck, the NBC chimes are used when Huey, Dewey, and Louie fall on top of Donald. A number of Three Stooges shorts, such as The Ghost Talks, used the chimes when someone hit all three of them in the head.

In the 1943 MGM animated short film Who Killed Who?, the NBC chimes are heard when a mysterious killer in a heavy black cloak and hood shoots him dead with a large pistol.

For a few years in the 1940s and 1950, NBC produced an in-house magazine named NBC Chimes.

Danang Radio and Television in Vietnam used the chimes and "The Tower" news music package from late 2017 to June 2025. In July 2025, it was replaced with the song "Quảng Nam Yêu Thương" after its rebrand from DanangTV to DNRT, but some programs still use the chimes.

=== Musical adaptations of the NBC chime notes ===
A number of news theme packages have included the NBC chimes, for example ones made for exclusive use by NBC stations, or as a variant used by NBC stations in themes syndicated to stations regardless of network affiliation. Songwriters have also incorporated the sequence, and some NBC-owned radio stations, including WNBC (now WFAN) included chimes in their station ID jingles. Examples include:

Songs:

- "I Love You (Three Little Tones)" (conjectured title; early 1930s?) A paean to the three-note NBC chimes of which little is known, including the singer, the orchestra or the circumstances under which it was recorded. Decades later, on October 7, 1978, the tune opened the first episode of the fourth season of Saturday Night Live. Garrett Morris sang the vocal, with backing by Laraine Newman, Jane Curtin, and Gilda Radner. Musical director Howard Shore conducted the orchestra.
- "Announcer Blues" by Paul Whiteman & his Orchestra (1935)
- "The Chool Song" by The King's Men (1942)
- "The NBC Polka" by Kurt Maier (1949)
- "The Three Chimes of Silver" by Meredith Willson (1951—the silver anniversary of NBC's 1926 founding)
- Around September 1953, the radio network produced a program titled Salute to the Three Chimes of NBC, which was summarized as "Five very different musical groups play an original composition, based on the NBC chimes, called 'Bing, Bang, Bong: A Fantasy On A Trademark.'"
- "Let's Go" by Ray Charles (on his 1961 album Genius + Soul = Jazz)
- "Here's Love" from the 1963 Meredith Willson musical Here's Love (it plays during the lyric "CBS to NBC")
- "Chimes" by Stanley Zabka, from his 1965 album Themes from Television.
- "Frosty" by Albert Collins (1969)
- "Do Your Thing" (album version) by Isaac Hayes (1971)
- "Twist On The 4th Chime" by Trunks on the album "Useless" (2007)

Jingle packages:

- "NBC Stations" by Edd Kalehoff
- "It's a New Day" and "The Tower" by Randall Wachtler
- "The Rock" by Stephen Arnold
- "The NBC Collection" by Frank Gari
- "L.A. Groove" by Groove Worx
- "Nothing But Class" and "The Only One" by JAM Creative Productions

== Bibliography ==
Journal article:

- Phillips, Rod, "The Chimes You Hear From Coast to Coast: A History Of The NBC Chimes", The Michigan Antique Radio Chronicle, Vol. 6 #4, 1991.
