= Jack Mullin =

American pioneering audio engineer (1913–1999)

- Born: John Thomas Mullin; October 5, 1913; San Francisco, California, U.S.
- Died: June 24, 1999 (aged 85); Camarillo, California, U.S.
- Education: Santa Clara University
- Occupation: Electrical engineer

John Thomas Mullin (October 5, 1913 – June 24, 1999) was an American pioneer in the field of magnetic tape sound recording and made significant contributions to many other related fields. From his days at Santa Clara University to his death, he displayed a deep appreciation for classical music and an aptitude for electronics and engineering. When he died in 1999, he was buried with a rosary and a reel of magnetic tape. A 2006 documentary movie, Sound Man: WWII to MP3, was made about his life and contributions to sound recording.

== Work with the Signal Corps ==
By 1943, German engineers had developed a high-quality form of magnetic tape sound recording, Magnetophon, that was unknown and unrivalled elsewhere. The Nazi radio networks used it to broadcast music and propaganda around the clock in hi-fi quality, which in the Allied context could only be reached by live broadcasts, which were the norm well into the 1950s.

From their monitoring of Nazi radio broadcasts during World War II, the Allies knew that German radio studios had some new kind of recorder that could reproduce high-fidelity sound in segments of unheard-of length, up to 15 minutes duration. But for several years, they did not know what these machines were or how they worked. It was not until Germany fell to the Allies during 1944-45 that the Americans discovered these magnetic tape recorders. Mullin saw the potential of the new technology, took two units with 50 tapes to the USA and developed and marketed them immediately after the war.

Mullin served in the U.S. Army Signal Corps during World War II. He was posted to Paris in the final months of the war, where his unit was assigned to find out everything they could about German radio and electronics. They found and collected hundreds of low-quality field dictating machines but the major discovery came when Mullin visited Germany just before the end of the war. He was sent to inspect a site near Frankfurt, where the Germans had reputedly been experimenting with using directed high-energy radio beams as means of disabling the ignition systems of flying aircraft. He said that when he heard the Magnetophon used by Radio Frankfurt: "I really flipped. I couldn't tell whether it was live or playback. There simply was no background noise."

On his way back home to San Francisco, Mullin made a chance stopover at a nearby German radio station at Bad Nauheim, which was already in American hands. Here he was given two suitcase-sized AEG 'Magnetophon' high-fidelity recorders and 50 reels of Farben recording tape. Mullin had them shipped home and over the next two years he worked on the machines constantly, modifying them and improving their performance. His main hope was to interest the Hollywood movie studios in using magnetic tape for movie sound recording.

== Stateside career ==
Mullin gave two public demonstrations of his machines in Hollywood in 1947, in which he first presented live music performed behind a curtain, followed by a concealed playback of the performance. Mullin's recorder caused a sensation among American audio professionals and many listeners could not tell the difference between the recorded and live performances. By luck, Mullin's second demonstration was at MGM Studios in Hollywood and in the audience that day was Bing Crosby's technical director, Murdo Mackenzie. Mackenzie arranged for Mullin to meet Crosby, and in June 1947 Crosby was given a demonstration of Mullin's magnetic tape recorders.

Crosby was impressed by the amazing sound quality and instantly saw the huge commercial potential of the new machines. Up to this time, most pre-recorded programming such as serials and drama were produced on disc, but live music was the standard for American radio at the time and radio networks tightly restricted the use of music on disc because of the comparatively poor sound quality.

Crosby, who was arguably the biggest star on radio at the time, was very receptive to the idea of pre-recording his radio programs. He disliked the regimentation of live broadcasts, and much preferred the relaxed atmosphere of the recording studio. He had already asked the NBC network to let him pre-record his 1944-1945 series on transcription discs, but the network refused, so Crosby had withdrawn from live radio for a year and returned for the 1946-47 season only reluctantly. Crosby realised that Mullin's tape recording technology would enable him to pre-record his radio show with a sound quality that equalled live broadcasts, that these tapes could be edited precisely, and replayed many times with no appreciable loss of quality. Mullin was asked to tape one show as a test; it was a complete success and Mullin was immediately hired as Crosby's chief engineer to pre-record the rest of the series.

Crosby became the first major music star to master commercial recordings on tape, and the first to use tape to pre-record radio broadcasts. The shows were painstakingly edited to give them a pace and flow that was wholly unprecedented in radio. Mullin has claimed that he even pioneered the use of the laugh track; at the insistence of Crosby's writer Bill Morrow, he inserted a segment of raucous laughter from an earlier show to follow a joke in a later show that had not worked well.

Keen to make use of the new recorders as soon as possible, Crosby invested $50,000 in a local electronics firm, Ampex, and the tiny six-man concern soon became the world leader in the development of tape recording. Ampex revolutionized the radio and recording industry with its famous Model 200 tape deck, developed directly from Mullin's modified Magnetophones. Crosby gave one of the first production models to musician Les Paul, which led directly to Paul's invention of multitrack recording.

Working with Mullin, Ampex rapidly developed two-track stereo and then three-track recorders. Spurred on by Crosby's move into TV in the early 1950s, Mullin and Ampex developed a working monochrome videotape recorder by 1956 and a version to record in color later on, both created to record Crosby's TV shows.

Through the rest of his life, Mullin continued to follow new ideas. He also kept an impressive collection of early recording hardware, which was donated in 1990 to the Pavek Museum of Broadcasting.

Mullin died of heart failure at his Camarillo, California home.

== See also ==
- John Herbert Orr
- Richard H. Ranger
- Charles Douglass
- Laugh track
- BCE Electronic Division
