= Fritz Pfleumer =

German inventor and engineer (1881–1945)

- Born: 20 March 1881; Salzburg, Austria-Hungary
- Died: 29 August 1945 (aged 64); Radebeul, Germany
- Known for: Magnetic tape

Fritz Pfleumer (20 March 1881 – 29 August 1945) was a German engineer who invented magnetic tape for recording sound.

== Biography ==
Pfleumer was born on 20 March 1881, in Salzburg, to Robert and Minna Pfleumer (née Hünich). His father Robert (1848–1934) was born in Greiz, and his mother Minna (1846–1932) was born in Freiberg. Fritz had five siblings – Mimi, Hans, Hermann, Otto, and Mizi. Hans emigrated to the US.

Pfleumer with his magnetic tape machine (1931)

Pfleumer developed a process for putting metal stripes on cigarette papers and reasoned that he could similarly coat a magnetic stripe to be used as an alternative to wire recording.

In 1927, after experimenting with various materials, Pfleumer used very thin paper that he coated with iron oxide powder using lacquer as glue. He received a patent in 1928.

On 1 December 1932, Pfleumer granted AEG the right to use his invention when building the world's first practical tape recorder, called Magnetophon K1. It was first demonstrated at the IFA in 1935.

Pfleumer died on 29 August 1945, aged 64, in Radebeul, after being hit by a truck.

Pfleumer later in life
