= Magnetophon =

Tape recorder developed in the 1930s

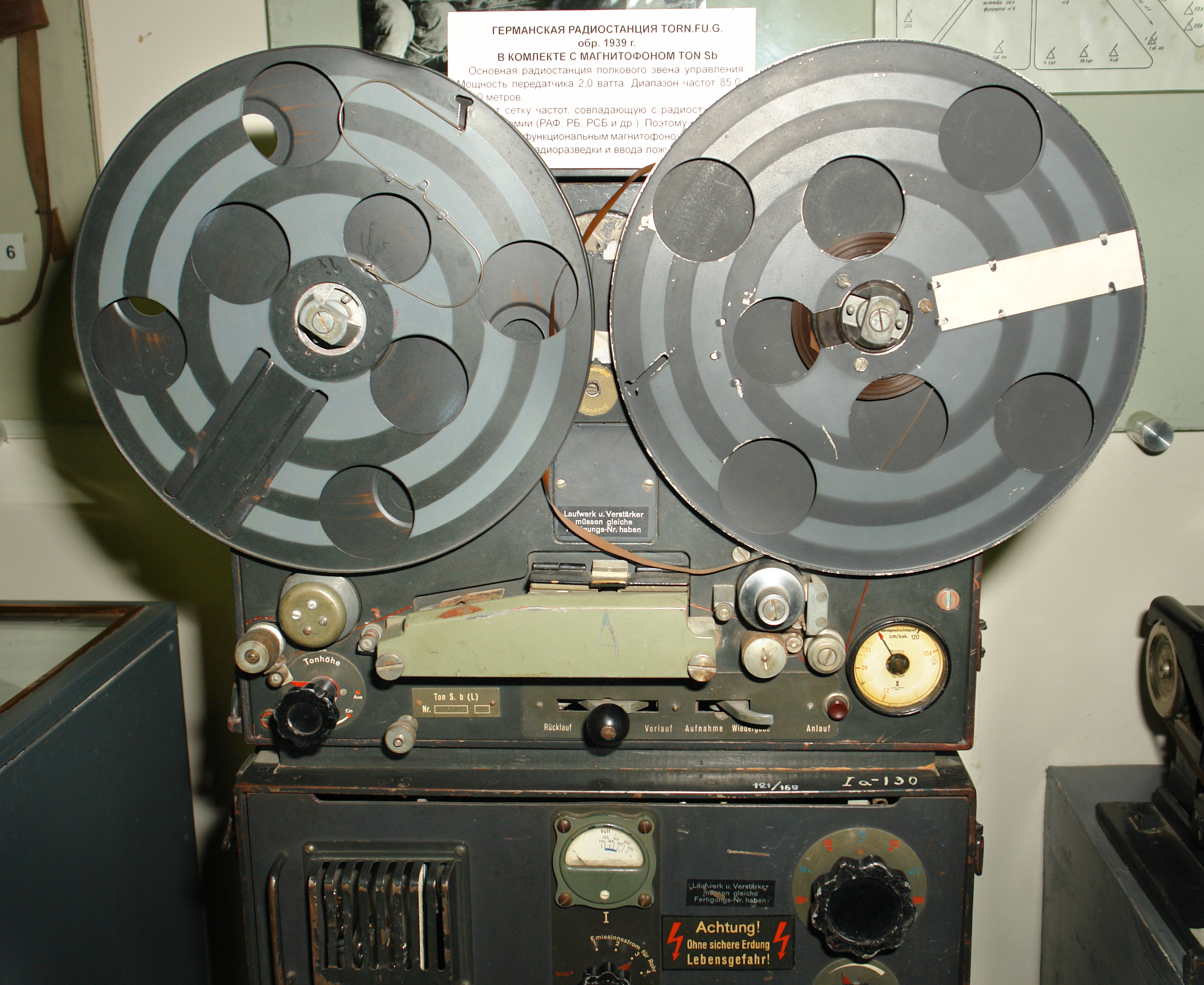
Tonschreiber from a German radio station in World War II.

Magnetophon was the brand or model name of the pioneering reel-to-reel tape recorder developed by engineers of the German electronics company AEG in the 1930s, based on the magnetic tape invention by Fritz Pfleumer. AEG created the world's first practical tape recorder, the K1, first demonstrated in Germany in 1935 at the Berlin Radio Show.

Later models introduced the concept of AC tape bias, which improved the sound quality by largely eliminating background hiss. The resulting reproduction was so great an advance on any existing recording method that even those well acquainted with the industry could not tell the recordings from live play. Adolf Hitler used these machines to perform what appeared to be live broadcasts from one city while he was in another. A cache of 350 of these tapes was released years later when they were found in Koblenz.

Two later model Magnetophons were taken to the United States at the end of the war, having been found in Bad Nauheim. These included both the newer oxide-coated PVC tape developed by I.G. Farben (BASF division) as well as the AC bias system. The Army officer who tracked them down, Jack Mullin, would use these machines as the basis of his own designs, which he demonstrated to the San Francisco chapter of the Institute of Radio Engineers in May 1946, and later at the MGM Studios in Hollywood in October of that year. Attending the SF demo were Ampex engineers Harold Lindsey and Myron Stolaroff, who were inspired to design their own reel-to-reel recorder based on Mullin's modified Magnetophon. Mullin's friend, Richard Ranger, had also designed his own take on the Mullinized Magnetophon called the Rangertone; however, a demonstration of that machine to American star singer and entertainer Bing Crosby, who had since 1945 been looking for a high-quality recording device to give him flexibility with his own radio broadcasts, did not go well. Mullin, who later worked for Bing Crosby Productions, subsequently arranged for Crosby to experience a demonstration of the machine designed by Lindsey and Stolaroff: the Ampex Model 200A. Although an initial showcase of the Ampex machine was unable to demonstrate recording, the audio quality of its playback was good enough to get Crosby to agree to work with them. With Bing Crosby arranging financial support for start-up manufacturing, the Ampex 200A went into production, and within three years most major recording studios had purchased one.

== History ==
The Magnetophon tape recorder was one of the first recording machines to use magnetic tape in preserving voice and music. At first, early Magnetophons gave disappointing results. One of the first concerts to be recorded on a Magnetophon was Mozart's 39th Symphony played by the London Philharmonic Orchestra, conducted by Sir Thomas Beecham, during their 1936 concert tour. The recording was made on an AEG K2 Magnetophon running at 100 cm/s. The tape used was the early black iron oxide Fe_{3}O_{4} type. When Beecham and the musicians heard the playback, they were greatly disappointed with the distortion and noise on the recording. Although the original tape is now lost, the recording survived until the 1990s and has been transferred. Some other surviving tapes show a tendency toward overmodulation.

Later in 1939, the Fe_{3}O_{4} oxide was replaced by the Fe_{2}O_{3} type, which gave a significantly better recording quality, so much that the formula became a worldwide standard as ferro-oxide until the 1970s when chromium dioxide tapes, yielding superior but above all longer-lasting sound quality, appeared.

Adding a direct-current bias to the record head gave some improvement, but in 1941, Hans Joachim von Braunmühl and Dr. Walter Weber, both engineers at the German national broadcasting organisation RRG (Reichs-Rundfunk-Gesellschaft), accidentally discovered the technique of high-frequency bias in which the simple addition of a high level (about 10X the maximum audio level) inaudible high-frequency tone resulted in a striking improvement in sound quality by effectively smoothing the magnetization of unused portions of the audio band. The discovery was made when a Magnetophon producing recordings of extraordinary quality was sent 'for repair'. The machine was found to have an oscillating DC bias amplifier. Magnetic media are inherently non-linear, but AC bias was the means whereby the magnetisation of the recording tape was made linearly proportional to the electrical signal which represents the audio component. The Magnetophon became a 'high fidelity' recording system because in so many respects, it outperformed gramophone recording (which was the 78 rpm system of the time).

Many speeches, concerts, and operatic performances were recorded. Since many of the recordings survived World War II they were later issued on LPs and compact discs. One of the more remarkable series of recordings took place at the Vienna State Opera House — in Austrian German Wiener Staatsoper — in 1944, when the German composer Richard Strauss recorded many of his famous symphonic poems, including Don Juan, Till Eulenspiegel, and Also sprach Zarathustra, with the Vienna Philharmonic Orchestra.

AEG engineers made rapid strides in perfecting the system and had practical stereo recorders by 1943. Until 1945, about 250 stereophonic tape recordings were known to exist, including some Richard Strauss and Furtwängler. Only three of those recordings are known to still exist. This includes a performance of Beethoven's "Emperor" Concerto with pianist Walter Gieseking and the Berlin Reichssenders Orchestra conducted by Artur Rother. This remarkable performance was later issued on LP by Varèse Sarabande. Later in 1993, the Audio Engineering Society (AES) issued a special CD for the 50th birthday of stereo recording. This CD not only includes the "Emperor" Concerto, but the two other stereo recordings known to exist: a Brahms serenade and the last movement of Bruckner's 8th Symphony conducted by Herbert von Karajan. Piano Library also issued the Emperor concerto, and Iron Needle issued the Bruckner recordings (catalog IN 1407). ArkivMusic released a CD of the concerto, as well a later recording Gieseking made of Beethoven's first piano concerto with the Rafael Kubelik and the Philharmonic Orchestra.

Magnetophon recorders were widely used in German radio broadcasts during World War II, although they were a closely guarded secret at the time. The Allies were aware of the existence of the pre-war Magnetophon recorders, but not of the introduction of high-frequency bias and PVC-backed tape. Their intelligence experts knew that the Germans had some new form of recording system but they did not know the full details of its construction and operation until working models of the Magnetophon were discovered during the Allied invasion of Germany during 1944-45.

== Influence and legacy ==
American audio engineer Jack Mullin acquired two Magnetophon recorders and fifty reels of magnetic tape from a German radio station at Bad Nauheim near Frankfurt in 1945. The allied forces were traveling through Germany during WWII when they first discovered the device. The Allies then handed the Magnetophon over to Mullin. Over the next two years Mullin modified and developed these machines, hoping to create a commercial recording system that could be used by movie studios.

"Murdo MacKenzie of Bing Crosby Enterprises had seen a demonstration of the German Magnetophon in June 1947--the same device that Jack Mullin had brought back from Radio Frankfurt, along with 50 reels of tape, at the end of the war."

American popular vocalist Bing Crosby, dissatisfied with the quality of existing radio network recordings was prevailed upon to invest in this development and would use the technology, as modified by Mullin and the fledgling Ampex company, to record his radio broadcasts in the more relaxed atmosphere of the recording studio, which was a significant break from the then-norm of live studio audience broadcasts. In 2008, at the 50th Annual Grammy Awards Ceremony, Ampex received the company's first Grammy Award for Technical Achievement, to honor their contribution sixty years earlier of the Ampex 200, which "revolutionized the radio and recording industries". Ampex 200 co-designer Myron Stolaroff was among the company's employees representing Ampex who accepted the award.

In 2004, the AEG K-1 Magnetophon was inducted into the TECnology Hall of Fame, an honor given to "products and innovations that have had an enduring impact on the development of audio technology."

== As a generic noun ==
Magnetophon became the generic word for the tape recorder in some languages including German ("Magnetophon"), Swedish ("magnetofon"), Czech, Polish (magnetofon), French (magnétophone), Italian (magnetofono - only for reel-to-reel), Romanian, Serbian, Croatian (magnetofon - only for reel-to-reel), Greek (μαγνητόφωνο - magnitofono), Russian (магнитофон - magnitofon), Bulgarian (магнетофон - magnetofon), Slovak, Spanish (magnetófono or magnetofón), Hungarian (magnetofon - commonly shortened to magnó), Finnish (magnetofoni - commonly shortened to mankka), Estonian (magnetofon - commonly shortened to makk), Lithuanian (magnetofonas), Latvian (magnetofons) and Ukrainian (магнітофон - magnitofon).

== See also ==
- History of multitrack recording
- Wire recording
- British Tape Recorder
