= New Brunswick Marconi Station =

Coordinates: 40.5144°N 74.4893°W

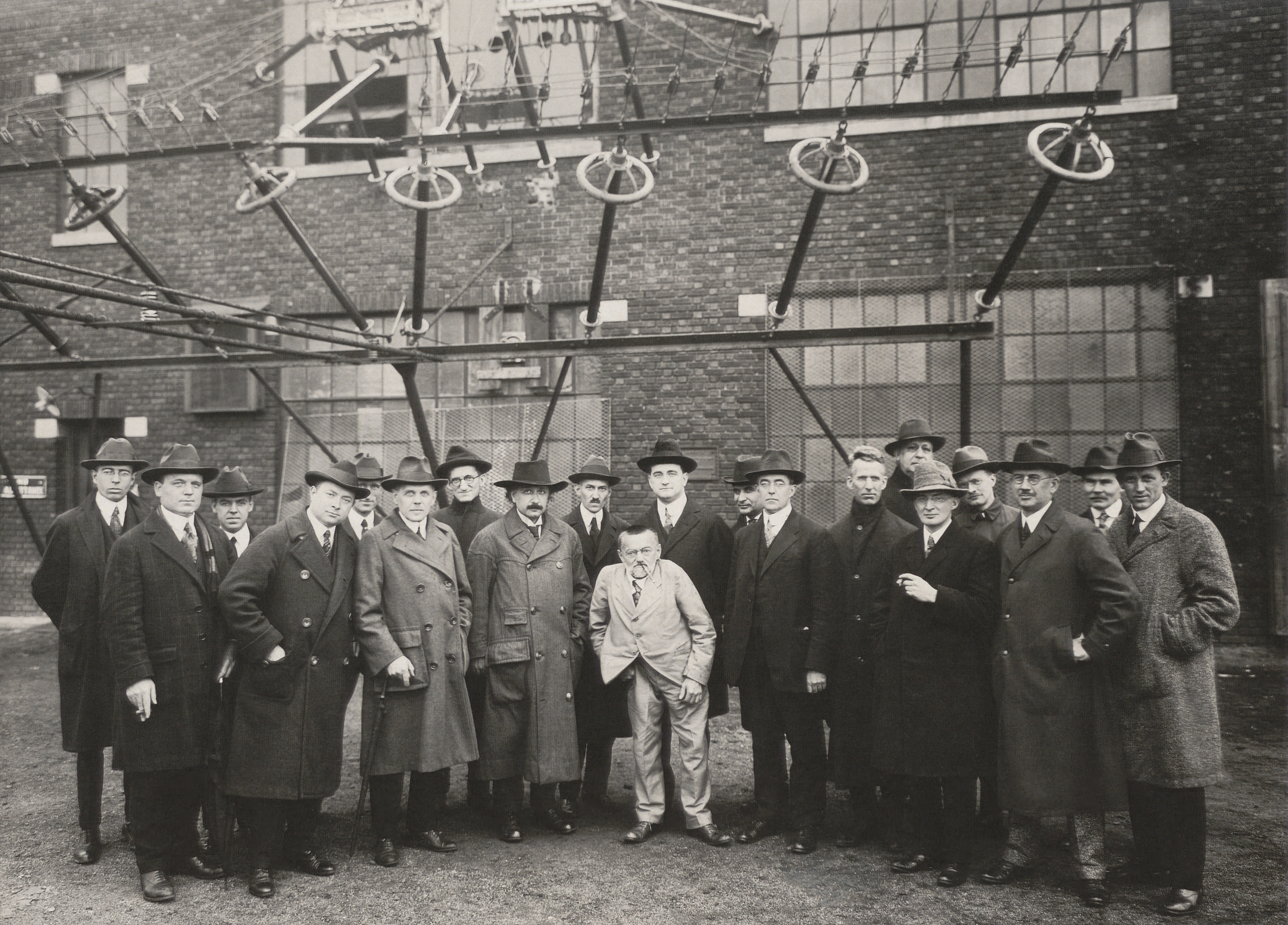
Albert Einstein visits the Marconi Wireless Station in Somerset, New Jersey in 1921

New Brunswick Marconi Station was located at JFK Boulevard and Easton Avenue just one mile from the New Brunswick border in Somerset, New Jersey.

== History ==
Ground was broken for the site on April 9, 1913, by the Marconi Wireless Telegraph Company of America. Although the station was completed in 1914 Marconi's planned commercial use for communication with his receiver station in Tywyn, Wales never took place because of the onset of World War I but was finally initiated by RCA on March 1, 1920. The station served as a backup to RCA's primary transmitting station on Long Island until the antenna masts and transmitter building were demolished in 1952.

The facility was confiscated by the United States government on April 7, 1917, the day after the United States declared war on Germany. The New Brunswick Naval Radio Station was the principal wartime radio communication link between the United States and Europe, using the callsign NFF. President Woodrow Wilson's Fourteen Points speech was transmitted to Europe from the New Brunswick Naval Radio Station in 1918. After the war, ownership of the station, along with Marconi's other US assets, were transferred from the Navy to RCA. The antenna masts were demolished in 1952 to make room for what is now Rutgers Plaza, but the buildings on the other side of JFK Boulevard were spared. All but one of the brick buildings were demolished around 2000 to make way for a storage locker facility. The bricks and tiles were saved for use in any future restoration of the spared building at 1100 Easton Avenue in Somerset, NJ, and the Marconi facility in Belmar, New Jersey.

The station used a huge 5,000-foot-long (1,500 m) antenna supported by eight 400-foot (120 m) steel masts. In June 1918 an Alexanderson alternator was installed, the invention of the General Electric engineer, with an output power of 200 kilowatts and looking like an ordinary power station generator. Its frequency was around 17 kHz, which made its wavelength around 17,500 meters.

== Legacy ==
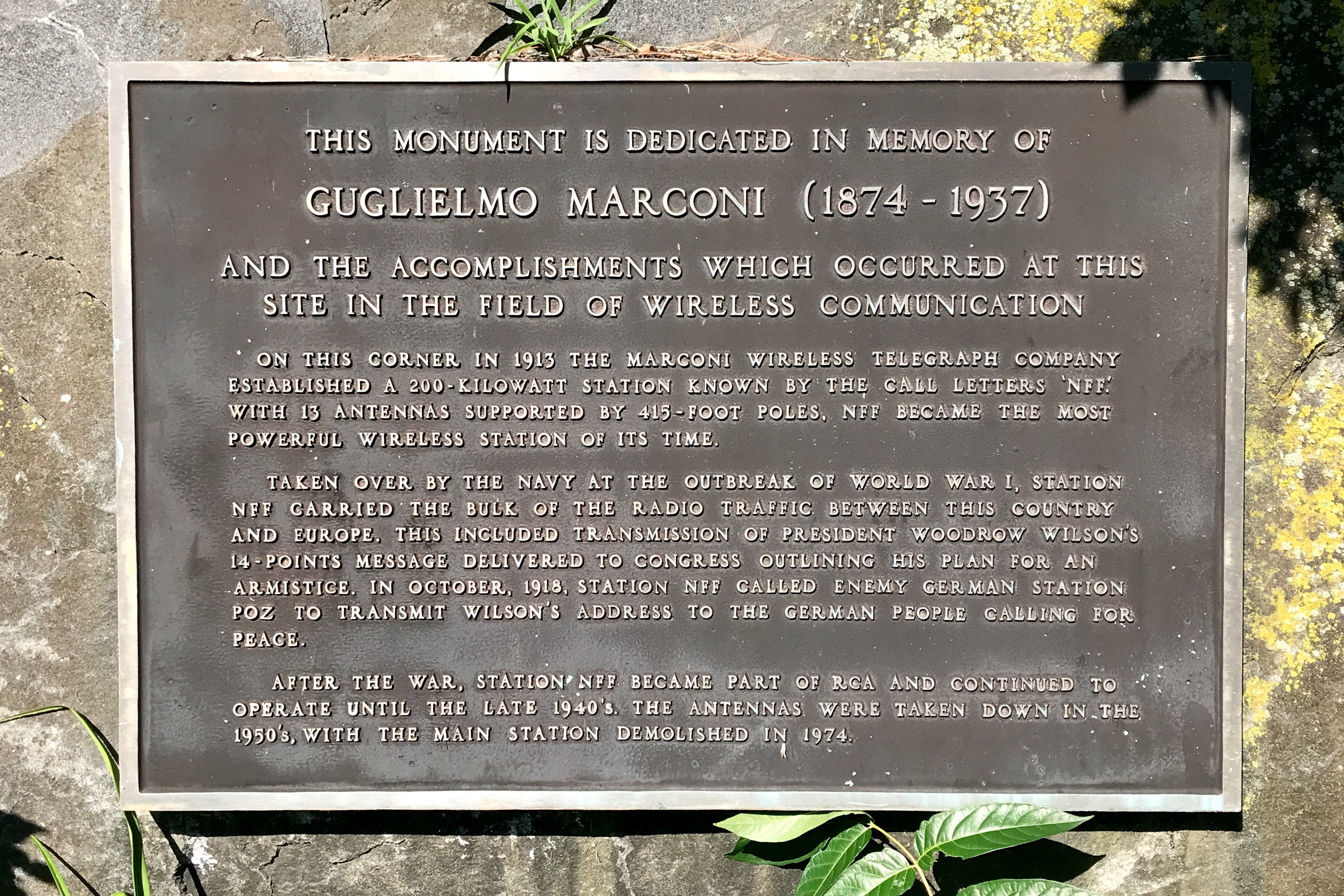
Guglielmo Marconi memorial plaque in the park

The Guglielmo Marconi Memorial Park was established on the site in 1992.
