= Walter Weber (engineer) =

Walter Weber (26 March 1907 in Gelsenkirchen – 18 July 1944 in German-occupied Kościan) was a German pioneer of electromagnetic sound recording.

From 1925 to 1927 he studied at the Oldenburg Academy of Engineering. From 1 May 1928 to 31 December 1930 he was an engineer at the central laboratory of Siemens & Halske AG in Berlin. There he met Hans-Joachim von Braunmühl. When he moved to the laboratory of the Reichs-Rundfunk-Gesellschaft, he followed him there in 1931. On 2 November 1938, he defended his thesis Das Schallspektrum von Knallfunken und Knallpistolen mit einem Beitrag über Anwendungsmöglichkeiten in der elektroakustischen Meßtechnik. (The sound spectrum of spark transmitters and oscillators with a contribution on possible applications in electroacoustic measuring technology), OCLC 433195435.

On 18 April 1940 the pair re-invented RF bias (HFVM), and on 10 June that year they exhibited their "HF magnetophone" at the Ufa Palace cinema in Berlin.
