= Videotape =

Magnetic tape used for storing video and sound simultaneously

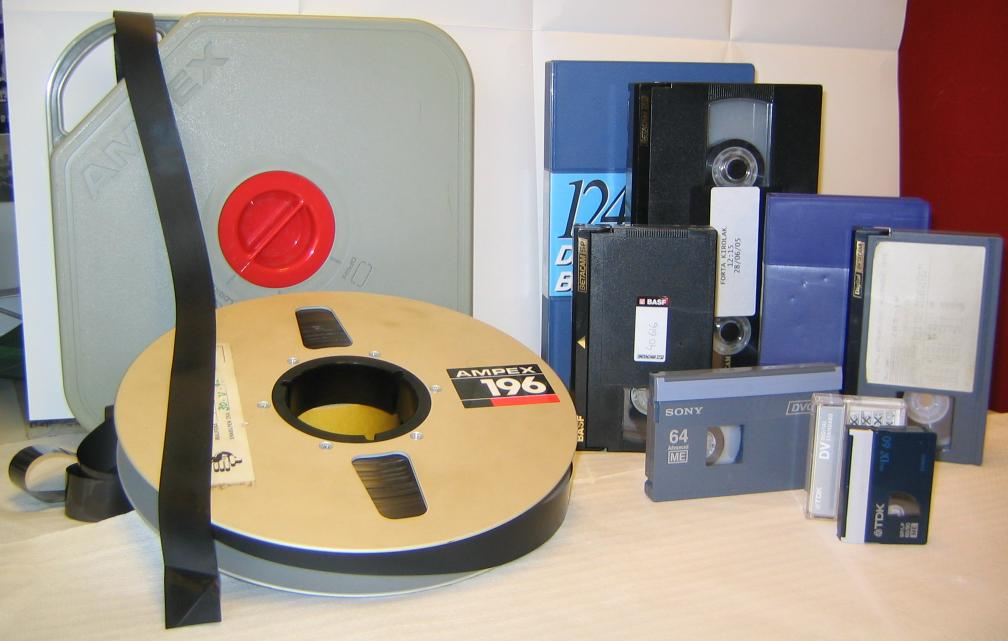
An assortment of videotapes

Videotape is magnetic tape used for storing video and usually sound in addition. Information stored can be in the form of either an analog or digital signal. The tape can come in a stand-alone tape reel or inside a casing such as a tape cartridge or cassette. Videotape is used in both video tape recorders (VTRs) and, more commonly, videocassette recorders (VCRs) and camcorders. Videotapes have also been used for storing scientific or medical data, such as the data produced by an electrocardiogram.

Because video signals have a very high bandwidth, and stationary heads would require extremely high tape speeds, in most cases, a helical-scan video head rotates against the moving tape to record the data in two dimensions.

Tape is a sequential access method of storing information and thus imposes delays to access a portion of the tape that is not already against the heads. The early 2000s saw the introduction and rise to prominence of high-quality random-access video recording media such as hard disks and flash memory. Since then, videotape has been increasingly relegated to archival and similar uses.

== Early formats ==
The electronics division of entertainer Bing Crosby's production company, Bing Crosby Enterprises (BCE), gave the world's first demonstration of a videotape recording in Los Angeles on November 11, 1951. In development by John T. Mullin and Wayne R. Johnson since 1950, the device gave what were described as "blurred and indistinct" images using a modified Ampex 200 tape recorder and standard one-quarter-inch (0.64 cm) audiotape moving at 360 inches (9.1 m) per second. A year later, an improved version using one-inch (2.5 cm) magnetic tape was shown to the press, who reportedly expressed amazement at the quality of the images, although they had a "persistent grainy quality that looked like a worn motion picture." Overall, the picture quality was still considered inferior to the best kinescope recordings on film. Bing Crosby Enterprises hoped to have a commercial version available in 1954, but none came forth.

The BBC experimented from 1952 to 1958 with a high-speed linear videotape system called Vision Electronic Recording Apparatus (VERA), but this was ultimately dropped in favor of quadruplex videotape. VERA used one-half-inch (1.3 cm) tape on 20-inch (51 cm) reels traveling at 200 inches per second (5.1 m/s).

RCA demonstrated the magnetic tape recording of both black-and-white and color television programs at its Princeton laboratories on December 1, 1953. The high-speed longitudinal tape system, called Simplex, in development since 1951, could record and play back only a few minutes of a television program. The color system used one-half-inch (1.3 cm) tape on 10 1/2-inch (270 mm) reels to record five tracks, one each for red, blue, green, synchronization, and audio. The black-and-white system used one-quarter-inch (0.64 cm) tape also on 10 1/2-inch (270 mm) reels with two tracks, one for video and one for audio. Both systems ran at 360 inches per second (9.1 m/s) with 2,500 feet (760 m) per reel yielding an 83-second capacity. RCA-owned NBC first used it on The Jonathan Winters Show on October 23, 1956, when a prerecorded song sequence by Dorothy Collins in color was included in the otherwise live television program.

In 1953, Norikazu Sawazaki developed a prototype helical scan videotape recorder.

BCE demonstrated a color system in February 1955 using a longitudinal recording on one-half-inch (one-point-three-centimetre) tape. CBS, RCA's competitor, was about to order BCE machines when Ampex introduced the superior Quadruplex system. BCE was acquired by 3M Company in 1956.

In 1959, Toshiba released the first commercial helical scan videotape recorder.

== Broadcast video ==
=== Quad ===
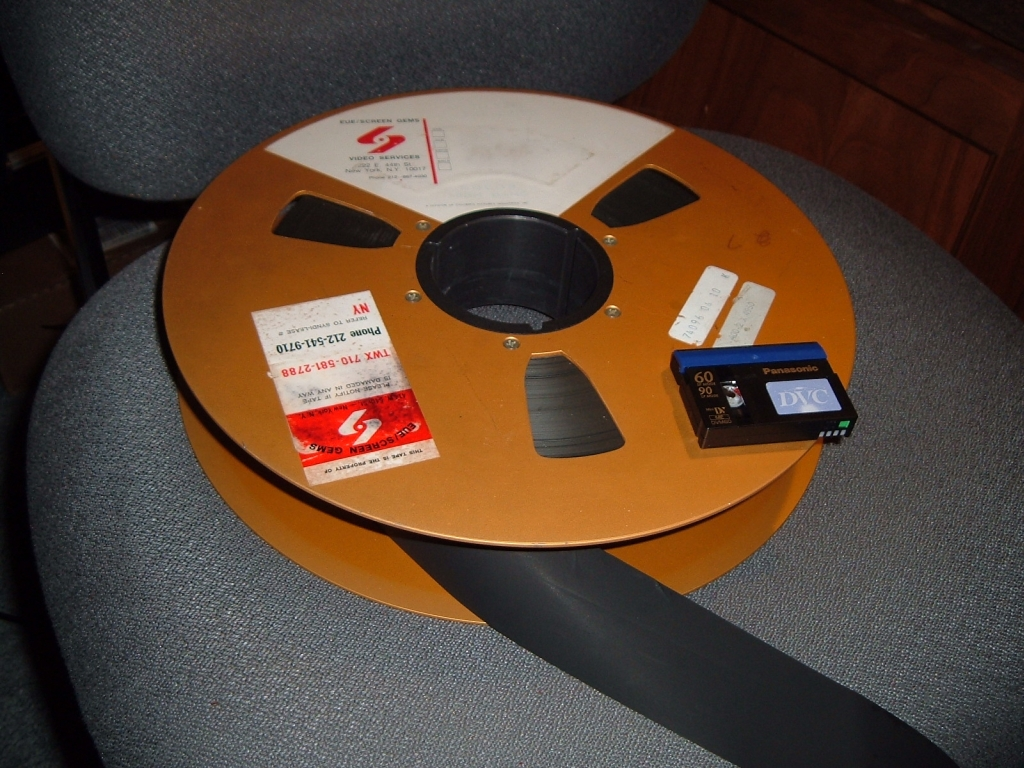
A 14-inch (36 cm) reel of 2-inch (5.1 cm) videotape compared with a MiniDV videocassette of the 1990s. Both media store one hour of color video.

The first commercial professional broadcast quality videotape machines capable of replacing kinescopes were the two-inch (5.1 cm) quadruplex videotape (Quad) machines introduced by Ampex on April 14, 1956, at the National Association of Broadcasters convention in Chicago. Quad employed a transverse (scanning the tape across its width) four-head system on a two-inch (5.1 cm) tape and stationary heads for the soundtrack.

CBS Television first used the Ampex VRX-1000 Mark IV at its Television City studios in Hollywood on November 30, 1956, to play a delayed broadcast of Douglas Edwards and the News from New York City to the Pacific Time Zone. On January 22, 1957, the NBC Television game show Truth or Consequences, produced in Hollywood, became the first program to be broadcast in all time zones from a prerecorded videotape.

Ampex introduced a color videotape recorder in 1958 in a cross-licensing agreement with RCA, whose engineers had developed it from an Ampex black-and-white recorder. NBC's special, An Evening With Fred Astaire (1958), is the second oldest surviving television network color videotape, and has been restored by the UCLA Film and Television Archive.

On December 7, 1963, instant replay, originally a videotape-based system, was used for the first time during the live transmission of the Army–Navy Game by its inventor, director Tony Verna.

Although Quad became the industry standard for approximately thirty years, it has drawbacks such as an inability to freeze pictures and no picture search. (Note: In fact, the quadruplex format can only reproduce recognizable pictures when the tape is playing at normal speed.) Also, in early machines, a tape could reliably be played back using only the same set of hand-made tape heads, which wore out very quickly. (Note: Later machines had longer life and used delay lines to compensate for the differences in the four heads.) Despite these problems, Quad is capable of producing excellent images. Subsequent videotape systems have used helical scan, where the video heads record diagonal tracks (of complete fields) onto the tape.

Many early videotape recordings were not preserved. While much less expensive (if repeatedly recycled) and more convenient than kinescope, the high cost of 3M Scotch 179 and other early videotapes ($300 per one-hour reel) meant that most broadcasters erased and reused them, and (in the United States) regarded videotape as simply a better and more cost-effective means of time-delaying broadcasts than kinescopes. It was the four time zones of the continental United States that had made the system very desirable in the first place.

Some early broadcast videotapes have survived, including The Edsel Show, broadcast live on October 13, 1957, and An Evening With Fred Astaire which aired on October 18, 1958 and was the oldest color videotape of an entertainment program known to exist until the discovery of the October 8, 1958 episode of the Kraft Music Hall hosted by Milton Berle. The oldest color videotape known to survive is the May 1958 dedication of the WRC-TV studios in Washington, D.C. In 1976, NBC's 50th-anniversary special included an excerpt from a 1957 color special starring Donald O'Connor; despite some obvious technical problems, the color tape was remarkably good. Some classic television programs recorded on studio videotape have been made available on DVD – among them NBC's Peter Pan (first telecast in 1960) with Mary Martin as Peter, several episodes of The Dinah Shore Chevy Show (late 1950s/early 60s), the final Howdy Doody Show (1960), the television version of Hal Holbrook's one-man show Mark Twain Tonight (first telecast in 1967), and Mikhail Baryshnikov's classic production of the ballet The Nutcracker (first telecast in 1977).

=== Types C and B ===
The next format to gain widespread usage was 1-inch (2.5 cm) Type C videotape introduced in 1976. This format introduced features such as shuttling, various-speed playback (including slow-motion), and still framing. Although 1 in Type C's quality was still quite high, the sound and picture reproduction attainable on the format were of slightly lower quality than Quad. However, compared to Quad, 1 in Type C machines required much less maintenance, took up less space, and consumed much less electrical power.

In Europe, a similar tape format was developed, called 1 in Type B videotape. Type B machines use the same 1-inch tape as Type C, but they lack C's shuttle and slow-motion options. The picture quality is slightly better, though. Type B was the broadcast norm in continental Europe for most of the 1980s.

=== Professional cassette formats ===
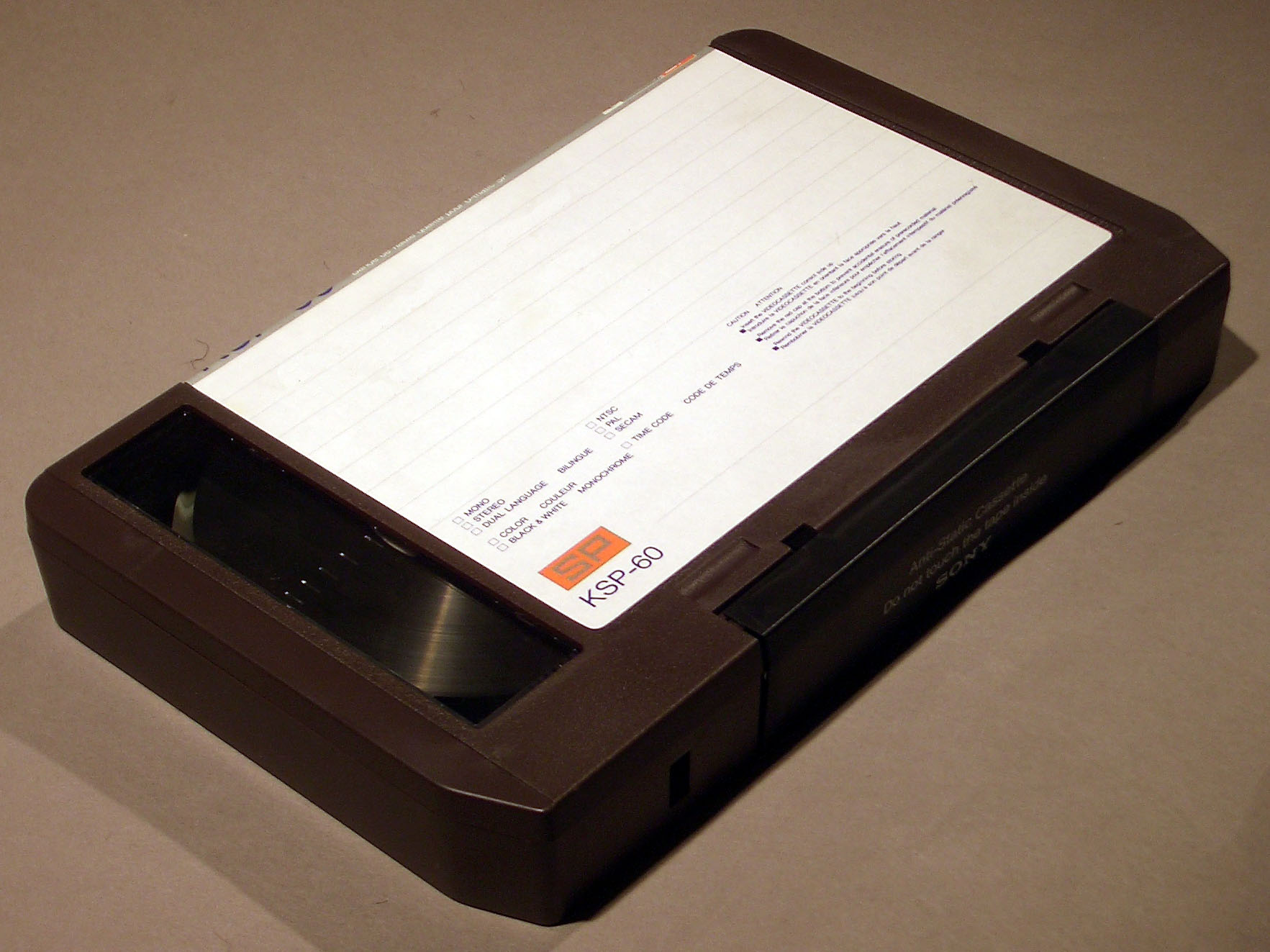
U-matic tape

A videocassette is a case containing videotape, which can be loaded directly into the videotape recorder or player without the need for manually threading the tape. In 1969, Sony introduced a prototype for the first widespread video cassette, the 3/4 in (1.9 cm) composite U-matic system, which Sony introduced commercially in September 1971 after working out industry standards with other manufacturers. Sony later refined it to Broadcast Video U-matic (BVU).

1982 saw the release of two competing professional 1/2 in (1.3 cm) component video cassette formats - Matsushita and RCA's M, and Sony's Betacam. Both formats, in their original form, used the same cassettes as their manufacturer's own consumer videocassette formats; M cassettes were based on VHS, and Betacam on Betamax. However, they are both incompatible with their earlier home media equivalents. While M and its successor MII saw some commercial success, by the late 1980s Betamax had all but overtaken it. Sony debuted the improved Betacam SP in 1987; this format saw wide adoption and use all through the 90s.

The first commercial videotape formats soon followed. Sony's D-1 was introduced in 1986 and featured uncompressed digital component recording. Because D-1 was extremely expensive, the composite D-2 (Sony, 1988) and D-3 (Panasonic, 1991) were introduced soon after. Ampex introduced the first compressed component recording with its DCT series in 1992. Panasonic's D-5 format was introduced in 1994. Like D-1, it is uncompressed, but much more affordable.

The DV standard, which debuted in 1995, was widely used both in its native form as MiniDV and in more robust professional variants.

In digital camcorders, Sony adapted the Betacam system with its Digital Betacam format in 1993, and in 1996 followed it up with the cheaper Betacam SX and the 2000 MPEG IMX format, The semiprofessional DV-based DVCAM system was introduced in 1996. Panasonic used its DV variant DVCPRO for all professional cameras, with the higher-end format DVCPRO50 being a direct descendant. JVC developed the competing D9/Digital-S format, which compresses video data in a way similar to DVCPRO but uses a cassette similar to S-VHS media. Many helical scan cassette formats, such as VHS and Betacam, use a head drum with heads that use azimuth recording, in which the heads in the head drum have a gap that is tilted at an angle, and opposing heads have their gaps tilted so as to oppose each other.

=== High definition ===
The introduction of high-definition television and video necessitated a medium for storing it. Early efforts were meant for Japan's MUSE analog HDTV system, in the form of Sony's HDVS product line in the 80s. In terms of videotape formats, this included a type-C-like 1-inch analog open reel tape, a digital format using roughly the same sort of tape, and an analog videocassette format called UniHi. The cameras, blank tapes, VTRs and other products in the system were prohibitively expensive, and as a result, adoption was very limited.

In 1997, Sony supplemented its Betacam family with the HD-capable HDCAM format, to much wider adoption. This was followed in 2003 with the improved HDCAM SR format. Panasonic's competing HD format for use in camcorders was the DVCPRO-based DVCPRO HD. For VTR and archive use, Panasonic expanded the D-5 specification to store compressed HD streams and called it D-5 HD.

Early cameras in Sony's CineAlta and Panasonic's Varicam digital cinema camera ranges recorded internally onto tape - HDCAM and HDCAM SR for Sony, and DVCPRO HD for Panasonic.

== Home video ==
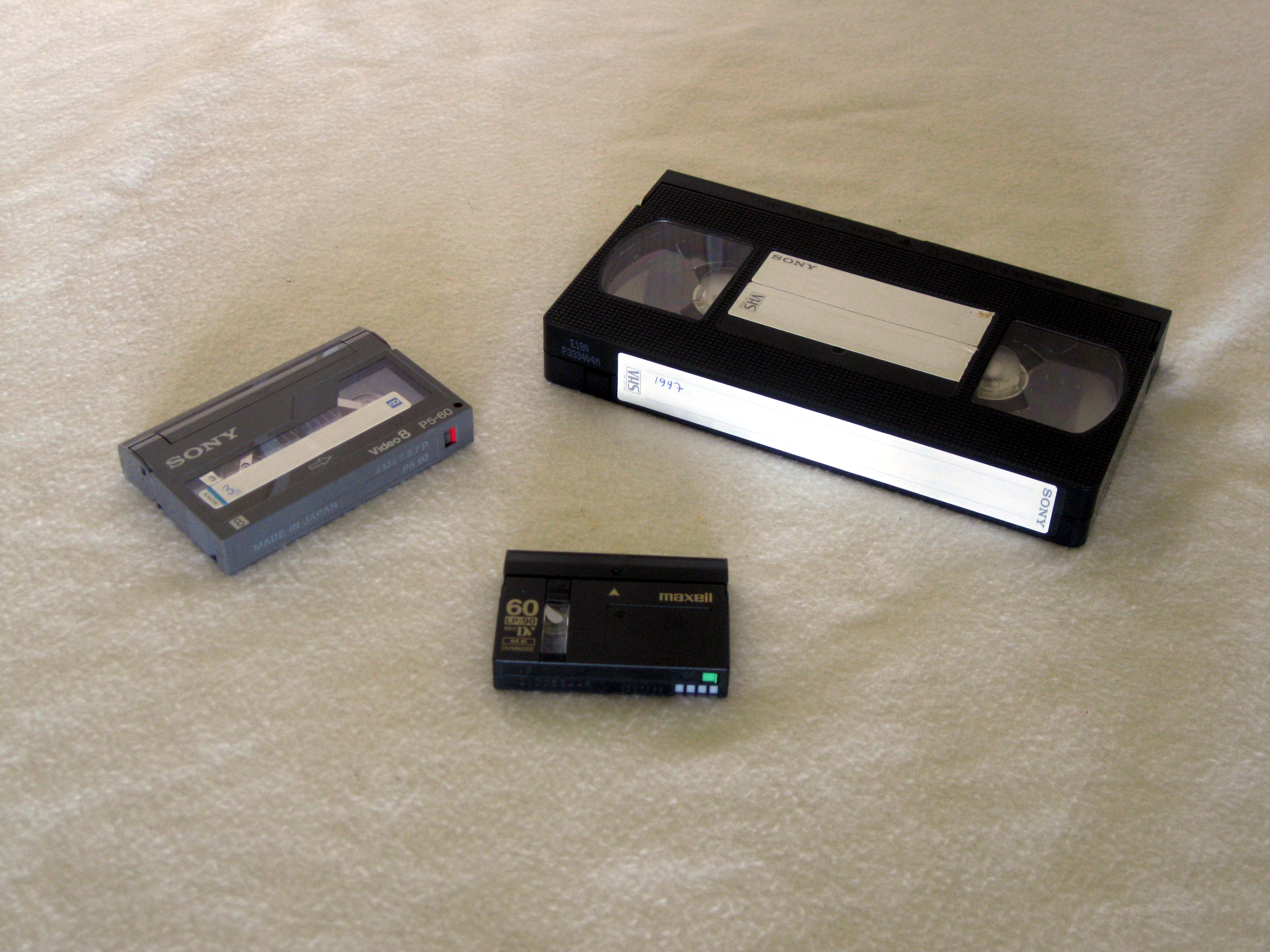
Video 8 (left), VHS (right) and MiniDV (bottom)

=== Videocassette recorders ===
The first consumer videocassette recorders (VCRs) used Sony U-matic technology and were launched in 1971. Philips entered the domestic market the following year with the N1500. Sony's Betamax (1975) and JVC's VHS (1976) created a mass-market for VCRs and the two competing systems battled the videotape format war, which VHS ultimately won. In Europe, Philips had developed the Video 2000 format, which did not find favor with the TV rental companies in the UK and lost out to VHS.

At first, VCRs and videocassettes were very expensive, but by the late 1980s, the price had come down enough to make them affordable to a mainstream audience. Videocassettes finally made it possible for consumers to buy or rent a complete film and watch it at home whenever they wished, rather than going to a movie theater or having to wait until it was telecast. It gave birth to video rental stores. Blockbuster, the largest chain, existed from 1985 to 2010. It also made it possible for a VCR owner to begin time shifting their viewing of films and other television programs. This caused an enormous change in viewing practices, as one no longer had to wait for a repeat of a program that had been missed. The shift to home viewing also changed the movie industry's revenue streams, because home renting created an additional window of time in which a film could make money. In some cases, films that did only modestly in their theater releases went on to have strong performances in the rental market (e.g., cult films).

VHS became the leading consumer tape format for home movies after the videotape format war, though its follow-ups S-VHS, W-VHS and D-VHS never caught up in popularity. In the early 2000s, in the prerecorded video market, VHS began to be displaced by DVD. The DVD format has several advantages over VHS tape. A DVD is much better able to take repeated viewings than VHS tape. Whereas a VHS tape can be erased through degaussing, DVDs and other optical discs are not affected by magnetic fields. DVDs can still be damaged by scratches. DVDs are smaller and take less space to store. DVDs can support both standard 4:3 and widescreen 16:9 screen aspect ratios, and DVDs can provide twice the video resolution of VHS. DVD supports random access while a VHS tape is restricted to sequential access and must be rewound. DVDs can have interactive menus, multiple language tracks, audio commentaries, closed captioning and subtitling (with the option of turning the subtitles on or off, or selecting subtitles in several languages). Moreover, a DVD can be played on a computer.

Due to these advantages, by the mid-2000s, DVDs were the dominant form of prerecorded video movies. Through the late 1990s and early 2000s, consumers continued to use VCRs to record over-the-air TV shows, because consumers could not make home recordings onto DVDs. This last barrier to DVD domination was broken in the late 2000s with the advent of inexpensive DVD recorders and digital video recorders (DVRs). In July 2016, the last known manufacturer of VCRs, Funai, announced that it was ceasing VCR production.

=== Consumer and prosumer camcorders ===
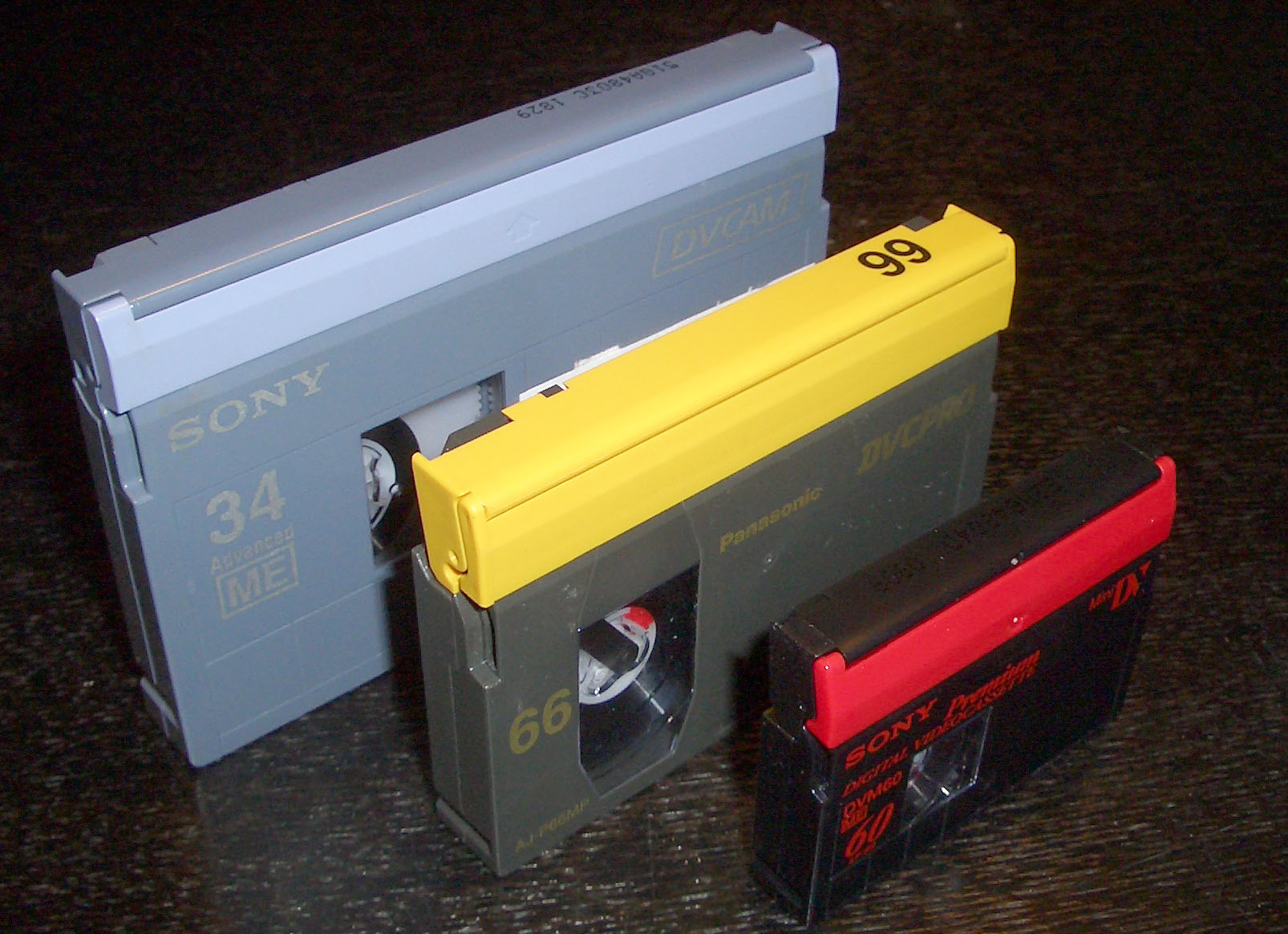
DV cassettes left to right: DVCAM-L, DVCPRO-M, DVC/MiniDV

Early consumer camcorders used full-size VHS or Betamax cassettes. Later models switched to more compact formats, designed explicitly for smaller camcorder use, like VHS-C and Video8. VHS-C is a downsized version of VHS, using the same recording method and the same tape, but in a smaller cassette. It is possible to play VHS-C tapes in a regular VHS tape recorder by using an adapter. After the introduction of S-VHS, a corresponding compact version, S-VHS-C, was released as well. Video8 is an indirect descendant of Betamax, using narrower tape and a smaller cassette. Because of its narrower tape and other technical differences, it is not possible to develop an adapter from Video8 to Betamax. Video8 was later developed into Hi8, which provides better resolution similar to S-VHS.

The first consumer-level and lower-end professional (prosumer) digital video recording format, introduced in 1995, used a smaller Digital Video Cassette (DVC). The format was later renamed MiniDV to reflect the DV encoding scheme, but the tapes are still marked DVC. Some later formats like DVCPRO from Panasonic reflect the original name. The DVC or MiniDV format provides broadcast-quality video and sophisticated nonlinear editing capability on consumer and some professional equipment and has been used on feature films, including Danny Boyle's 28 Days Later (2002, shot on a Canon XL1) and David Lynch's Inland Empire (2006, shot on a Sony DSR-PD150).

In 1999 Sony backported the DV recording scheme to 8-mm systems, creating Digital8. By using the same cassettes as Hi8, many Digital8 camcorders were able to play analog Video8 or Hi8 recordings, preserving compatibility with already recorded analog video tapes.

Sony introduced another camcorder cassette format called MicroMV in 2001. Sony was the only electronics manufacturer to sell MicroMV cameras. In 2006, Sony stopped offering new MicroMV camcorder models. In November 2015, Sony announced that shipment of MicroMV cassettes would be discontinued in March 2016.

In the late 2000s, MiniDV and its high-definition cousin, HDV, were the two most popular consumer or prosumer tape-based formats. The formats use different encoding methods, but the same cassette type.

== Future of tape ==
With advances in technology, videotape has moved past its original uses (original recording, editing, and broadcast playback) and is now primarily an archival medium. The death of tape for video recording was predicted as early as 1995 when the Avid nonlinear editing system was demonstrated, storing video clips on hard disks. Yet videotape was still used extensively, especially by consumers, up until about 2004, when DVD-based camcorders became affordable and domestic computers had large enough hard drives to store an acceptable amount of video.

Consumer camcorders have switched from being tape-based to tapeless machines that record video as computer files. Small hard disks and writable optical discs have been used, with solid-state memory such as SD cards being the current market leader. There are two primary advantages: First, copying a tape recording onto a computer or other video machine occurs in real time (e.g., a ten-minute video would take ten minutes to copy); since tapeless camcorders record video as computer-ready data files, the files can be copied onto a computer significantly faster than real time. Second, tapeless camcorders, and those using solid-state memory in particular, are far simpler mechanically and so are more reliable.

Despite these conveniences, tape is still used extensively by filmmakers and television networks because of its longevity, low cost, and reliability. Master copies of visual content are often stored on tape for these reasons, particularly by users who cannot afford to move to tapeless machines. During the mid- to late 2000s, professional users such as broadcast television were still using tape heavily, but tapeless formats like P2, XDCAM and AVCHD were gaining broader acceptance.

While live recording has migrated to solid-state and hard disks, the high cost of solid-state drives and the limited shelf life of hard-disk drives make them less desirable for archival use, for which tape is still used.
