= D6 HDTV VTR =

HD Digital Magnetic tape-based videocassette format

D6 VTR Tape Deck
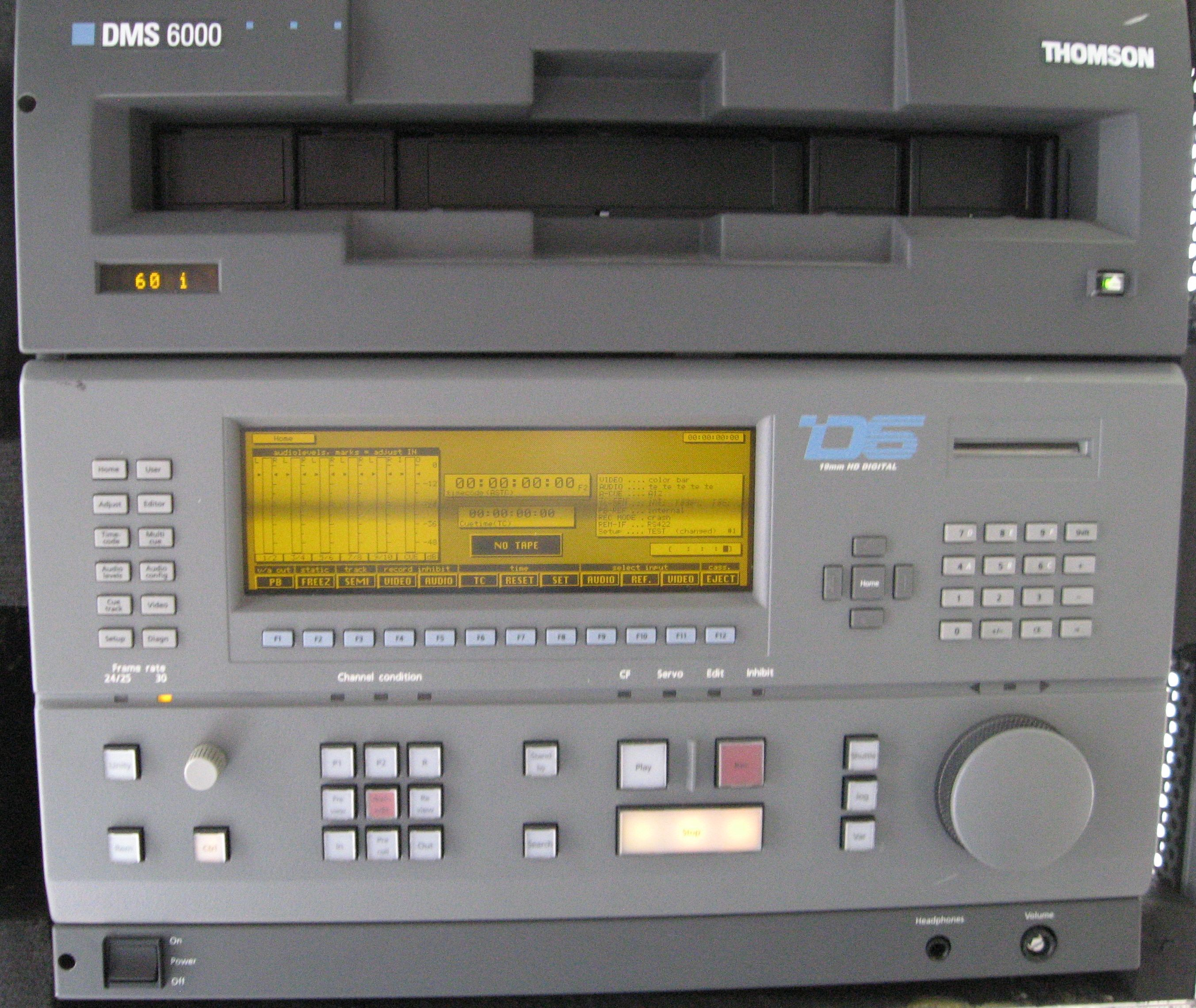
- D6 VTR tape deck
- Media type: Magnetic tape, ¾-inch
- Encoding: HDTV digital 1920 × 1080
- Capacity: 500 GBytes max capacity on large cassette
- Read mechanism: 128 MBtes/sec
- Write mechanism: 128 MBtes/sec
- Standard: Interlaced video, progressive modes and segmented frame mode
- Usage: Broadcast TV and post-production
- Released: 2000

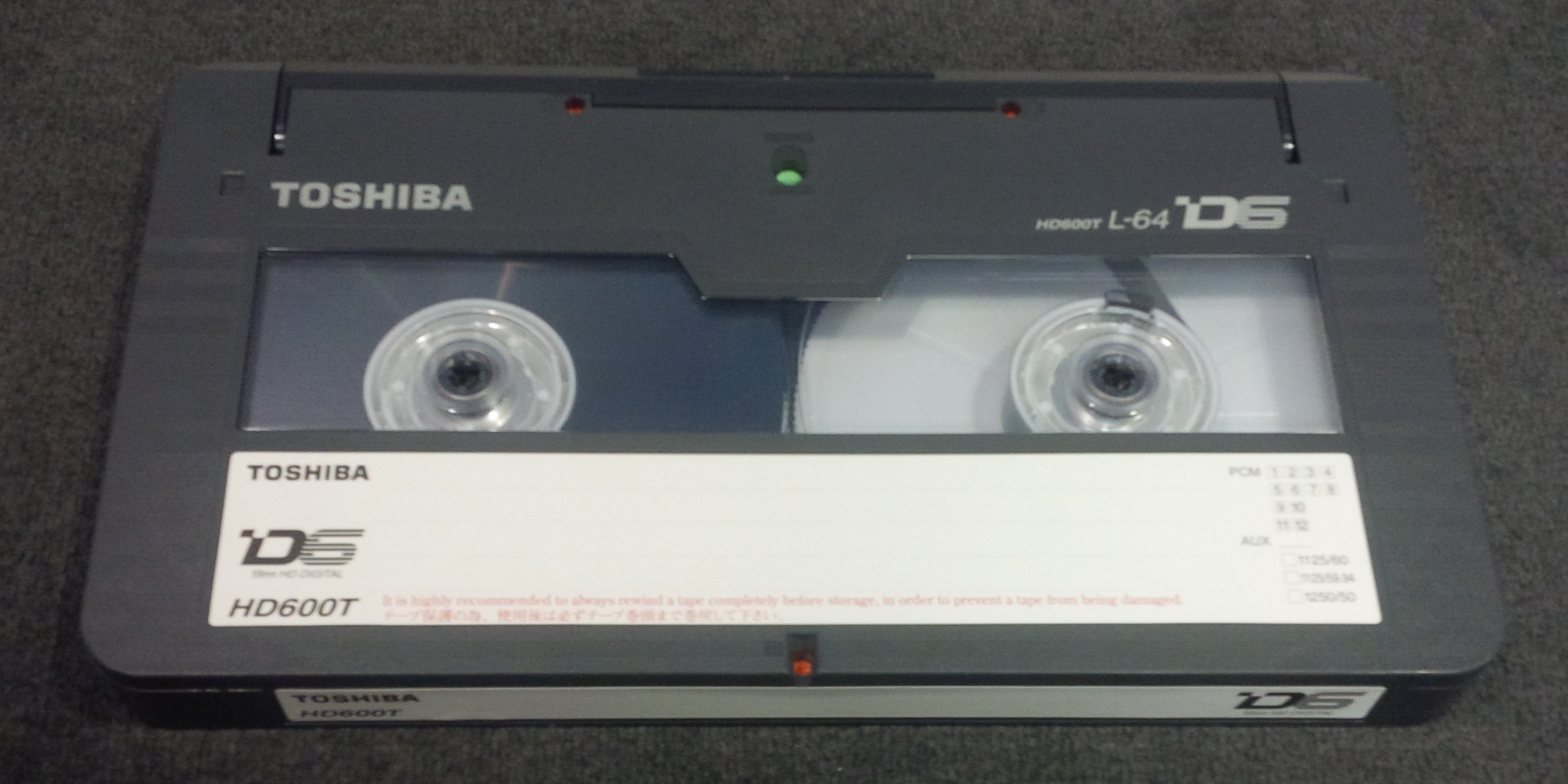
A D6 tape from Toshiba

D6 HDTV VTR is SMPTE videocassette standard. A D6 VTR can record and playback HDTV video uncompressed. The only D6 VTR product is the Philips, now Thomson's Grass Valley's Media Recorder, model DCR 6024, also called the D6 Voodoo VTR. The VTR was a joint project between Philips Digital Video Systems of Germany and Toshiba in Japan. The tape deck module was designed and made by Philips in Weiterstadt, Germany (formerly Bosch Fernseh), and the digital processor module designed and made by Toshiba. Since there is no data compression, after 20 tape copies of multi generations there is no noticeable loss of quality. As a very high-end, costly system about 70 were sold to high-end post houses from about 2000 to 2005. The VTR had a data record option. The data module could record and play back 2k DPX files at 6 frames per second over a HIPPI connection. The VTR came in a data only model, or with a switch module, so the record deck could be used for both video and data recording. The tape deck was also sold stand alone as a giga bit recorder to record and playback raw data. Toshiba made the video tape for the VTR. The high price of the video tape limited the use of the VTR.

== Specs ==
- Tape format D-6 19 mm tape cassette housing, SMPTE 277/278M
- Also marketed under the name "Digital Voodoo"
- The tape cassette housing looks like a 19 mm D1 or D2 cassette, but inserting these older standard definition tape cassettes would be rejected by the VTR.
- Magnetic tape is a metal particle tape
- Scanner diameter 96 mm, a helical scan
- Track pitch: 22 um
- D6 tape thickness 11 um
- Head to tape speed ~46 m/s
- Tape speed ~497 mm/s
- Records and playback of 1 Gbit/s uncompressed data—the only real-time uncompressed HD videotape format marketed (the more ubiquitous Sony HDCAM, Panasonic D5-HD and Sony XDCAM HD/422 all used compression)
- Uses cassette sizes L – M – S
- Recording time:
  - Small type 8 minutes
  - Med. type 28 minutes
  - Large type 64 minutes
- Helical scan Record heads 2 clusters of 8 (0/180) total of 16
- Play heads 2 clusters of 8 (0/180) Total of 16
- Erase heads 2 (0/180)
  - Yes, that is a total of 34 heads on the scanner.
- Video error correction Reed Solomon code, 2D
- Longitudinal tracks three: Control track, Timecode and, Audio cue
- Playback Slow motion ± ¼ and with a video visible search mode
- HDTV Video Signal Formats (SMPTE 274M)
  - 1920 × 1080 @ 24p
  - 1920 × 1080 @ 23.976p
  - 1920 × 1080 @ 25p
- Progressive modes DTV
  - 1920 × 1080 @ 24sF
  - 1920 × 1080 @ 23.976sF
  - 1920 × 1080 @ 25sF ”segmented frame” modes
  - 1920 × 1080 @ 60i
  - 1920 × 1080 @ 59.94i
  - 1920 × 1080 @ 50i 2:1 interlace modes
- The unit can cross play some formats
- Sampling Frequency 4:2:2:
  - Luminance Y 74.25 MHz and 74.25/1.001 = 74.1758 MHz
  - Chrominance 37.125 MHz and 37.125/1.001 = 37.0879 MHz
- Quantization:
  - Y-Luminance = 10 Bits 24/25 fr/sec modes and 8 Bits 30 fr/sec modes
  - Chroma = 8 Bits
- AUDIO:
  - 30 Frames System: 10 channel, 5 stereo pairs
  - 24/25 Frames System: 12 channels, 6 stereo pairs
  - Audio standard AES/EBU
  - Sampling frequency 48 kHz
  - Quantization, digital I/O 20 or 24 bit

== Worldwide past users list ==
Europe:

- Artisan video, Netherlands
- Augustus, Italy
- Cinefekt
- Digital Film Lab, Copenhagen, Denmark
- Digital Images, Halle, Germany
- Digital Film Finland, Helsinki, Finland
- DMV Research, UK
- Eclair Épinay, France
- Frame Image, Helsinki, Finland
- Frithiof Telecine, Stockholm, Sweden
- Generator Post, Finland
- Geyer Video, Berlin, Germany
- Interactive Group, Milan, Italy
- LTC Scanlab, France
- Listo, Vienna, Austria
- Mars Motel, Sweden
- Molinare, Spain
- Philips Research, Netherlands
- Rudas, Germany
- Sertek, Turkey
- Short Cut, Denmark
- Epoka Ltd, Poland
- EBH Polska, Warsaw, Poland
- Taurus Media Technik, Munich, Germany
- VCC, Hamburg, Germany
- VDM Courbevoie, France
- Video Copy Company – VCC, Berlin, Germany
- VTR, London
- Warehouse, Denmark

Americas:

- Casablanca Finish Ltda, São Paulo, Brazil
- Command Post, Toronto, Canada
- Complete Post, Hollywood, CA
- Discreet, Montreal, Canada
- Digital Images, Los Angeles, CA
- Galicia Ramirez y Asoc. Mex., Mexico
- The Ed Guzman HDTV Museum, Burbank, CA
- Industrial Light and Magic, San Francisco, CA
- IVC, International Video Conversions, Burbank, CA
- Laser Pacific, Hollywood, CA
- Library of Congress, Washington, DC
- Mega, Brazil
- TV Globo, Brazil
- Rhinoceros Editorial & Post, New York, NY
- SMA Video, New York, NY
- Technique, Burbank, CA
- Vid-Film (now Technicolor Creative Services), Glendale, CA

Asia/Pacific

- Noriko Post, Osaka, Japan

== Photo gallery ==
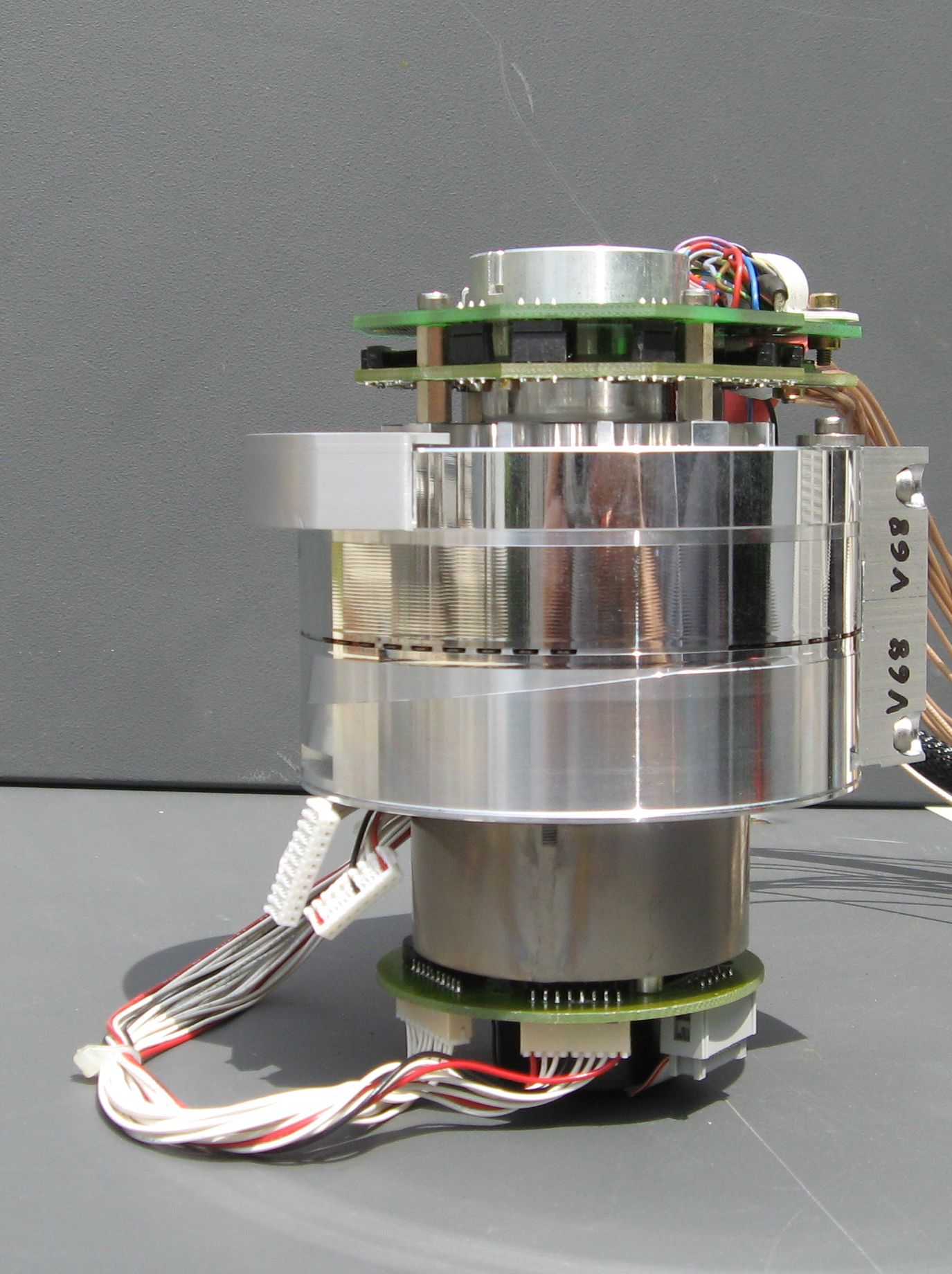
D6 VTR scanner, removed

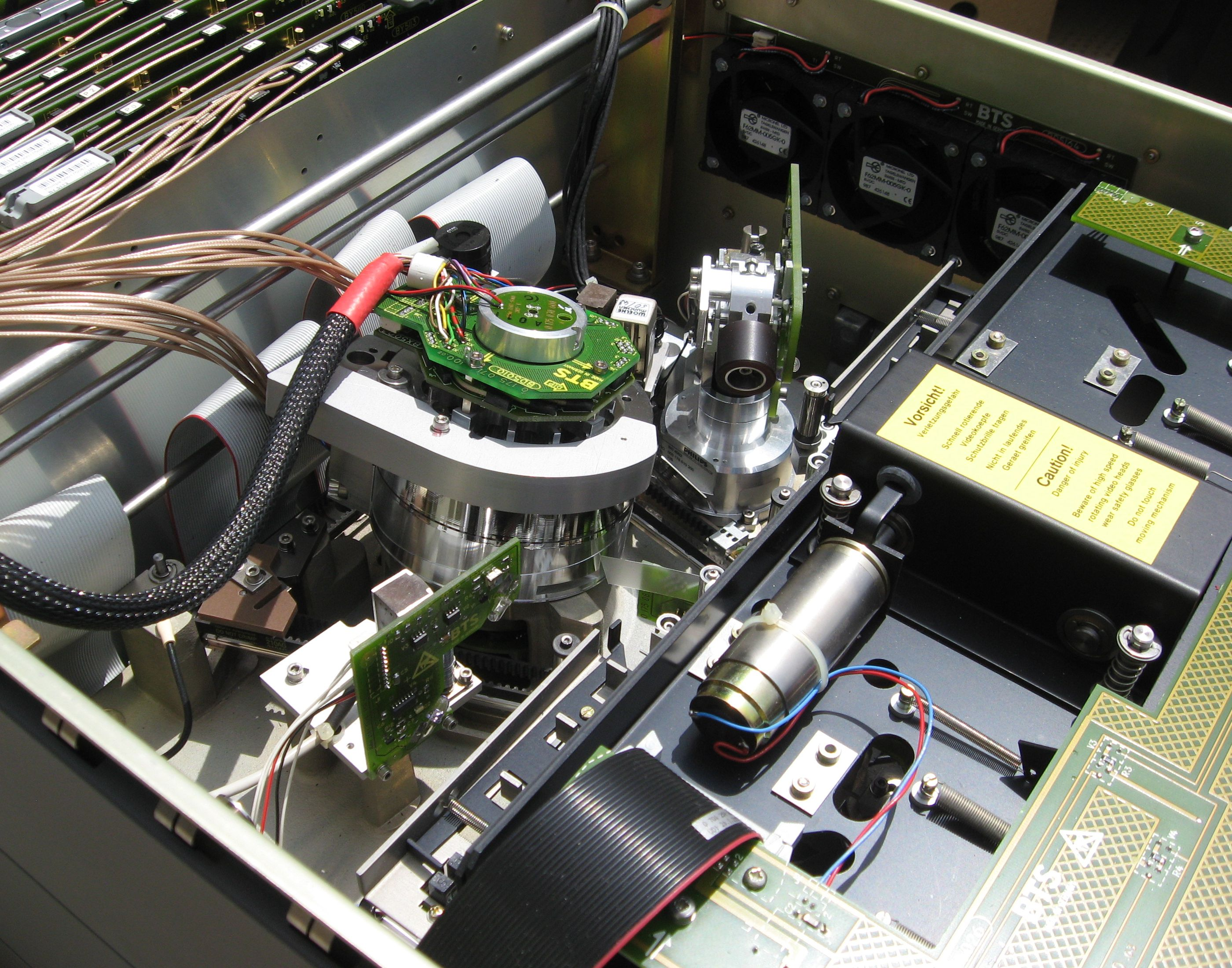
Inside a D6 VTR tape deck

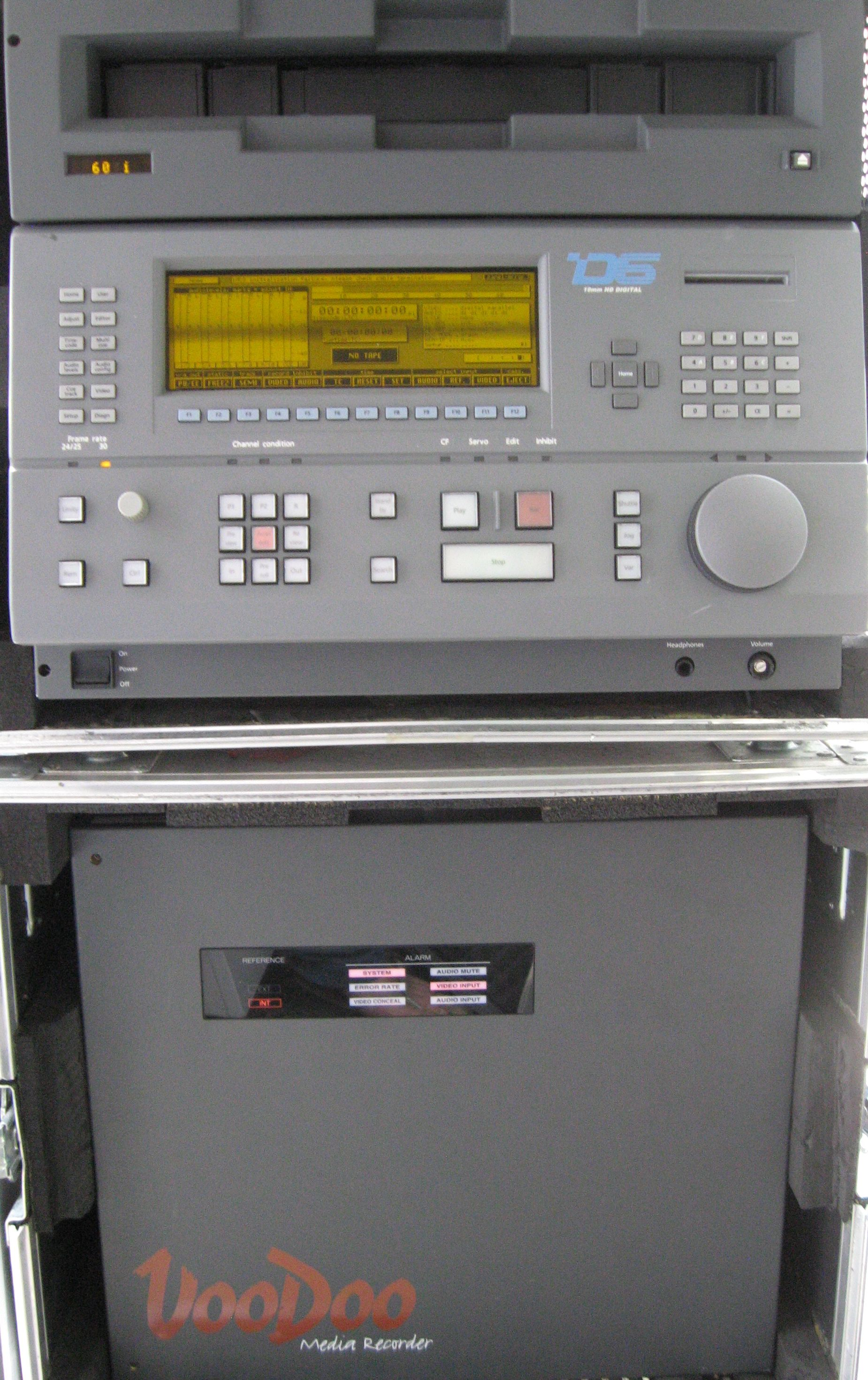
D6 VTR full unit

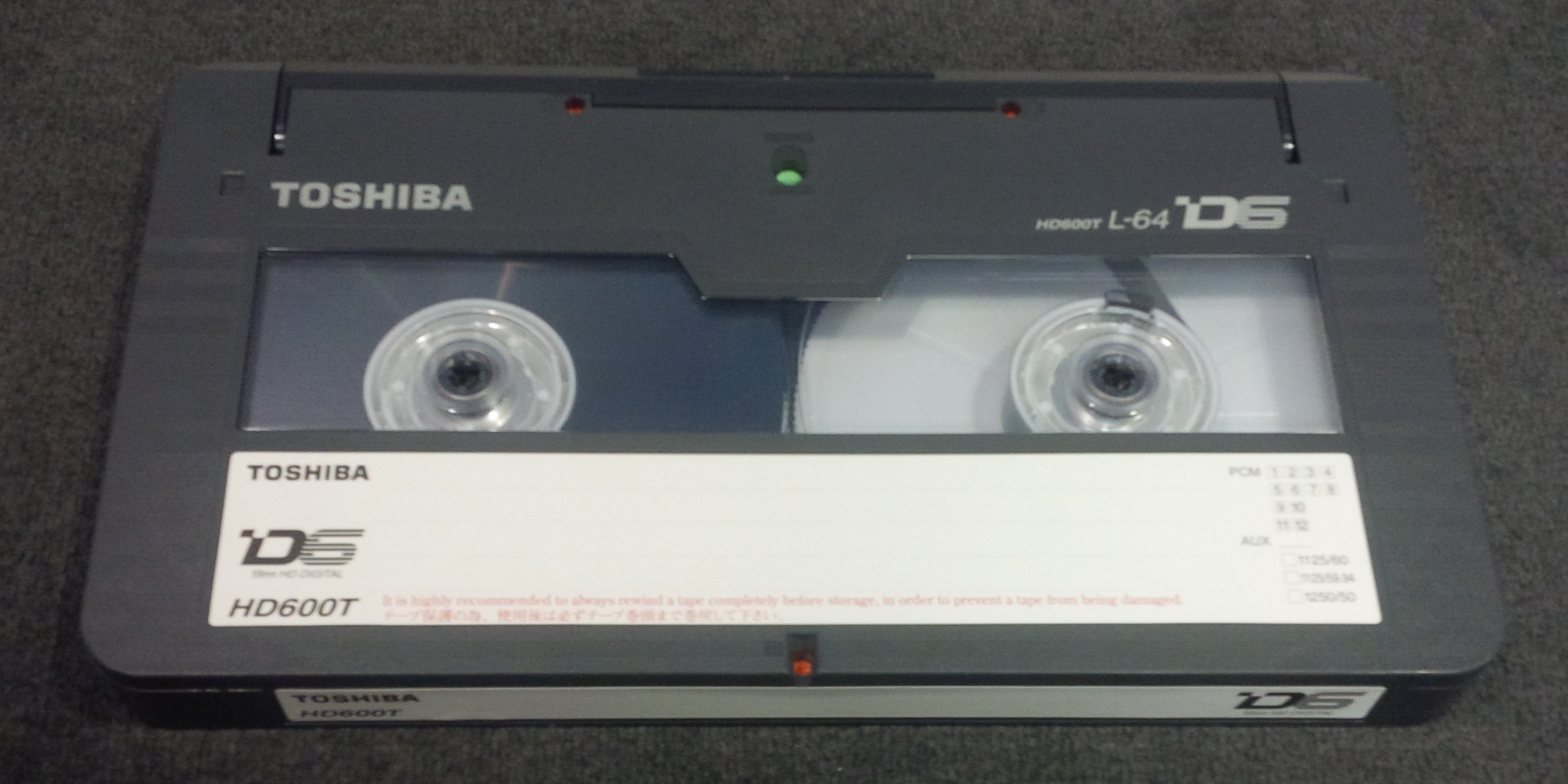
D6 HDTV tape

== See also ==
- Spirit DataCine
- D5 HD
- HDCAM (D-11)
- DVCPRO HD (D-12)
