= DCT (videocassette format) =

Magnetic tape-based videocassette format

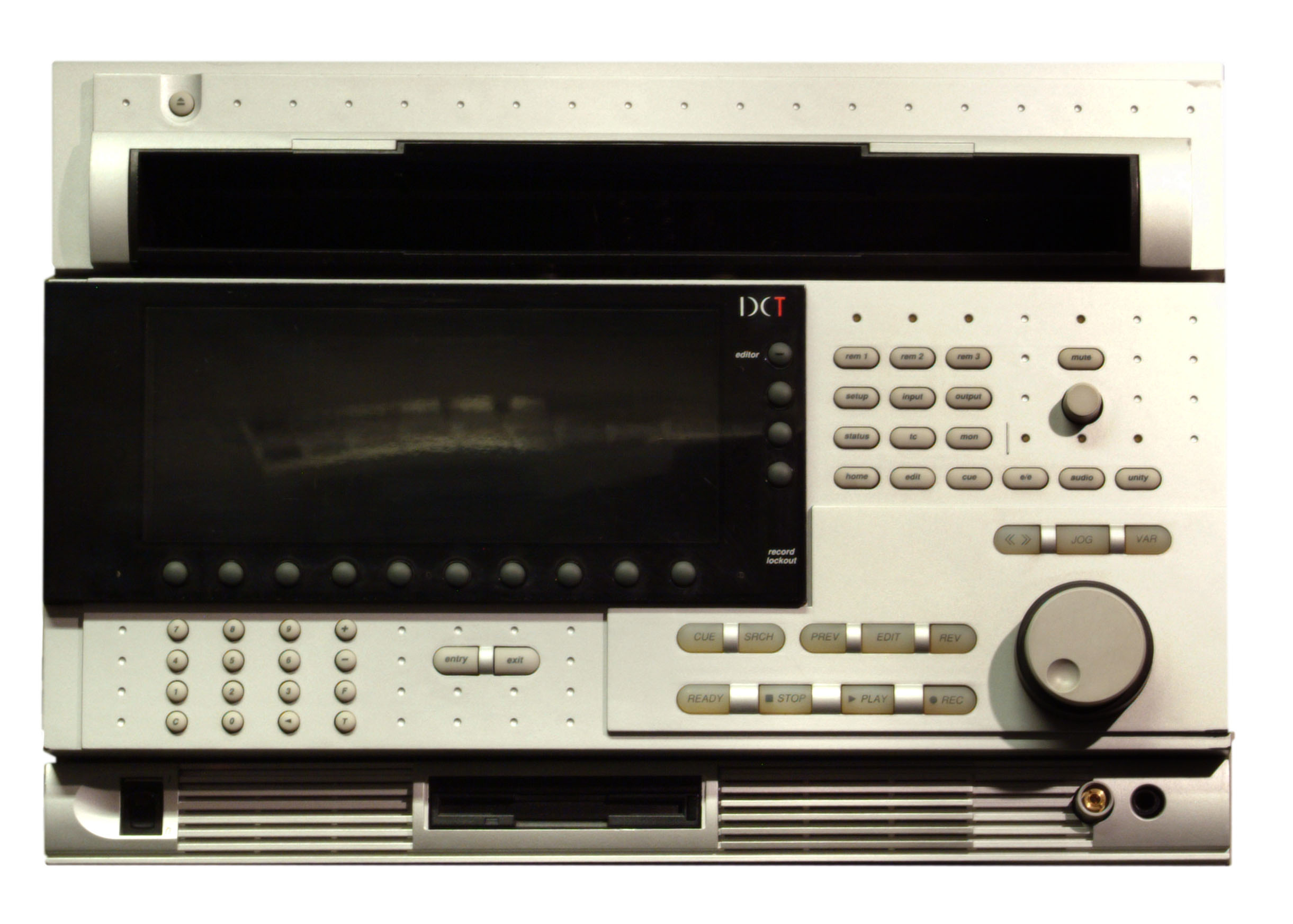
- Ampex DCT VCR
- Media type: Magnetic tape, ¾-inch
- Encoding: NTSC, PAL
- Read mechanism: Helical scan
- Write mechanism: Helical scan
- Standard: Interlaced video
- Developed by: Ampex
- Dimensions: 19 mm tape
- Usage: Video production
- Released: 1992; 34 years ago

DCT is a digital recording component video videocassette format developed and introduced by Ampex in 1992. It was based on the D1 format, and unlike the uncompressed recording scheme of D1, it was the first digital videotape format to use data compression. Like D1 (and D2), it uses a similar cassette loaded with 3/4" (19mm) width tape.

One of the models of VCR released for the format was the Ampex DCT-1700D.

== Overview ==
The type of data compression used by the format, discrete cosine transform (DCT), shares the same acronym as the format, but the meaning is different for the latter (the format's acronym meaning Data Component Technology).

DST (Data Storage Technology), a data-only version of DCT, was also developed by Ampex at the same time for the backup and archiving of data from servers and other enterprise-oriented IT systems. However, it was used by television networks such as Fox and The Discovery Channel in the late 1990s to early 2000s for mass storage of video file data for their aired programming originating from their video servers for on-air playout, with the servers being networked to a robotic DST tape jukebox (such as an Ampex DST 800 Automated Cartridge Library) for video file access.

DCT was also used by movie studios such as Warner Brothers for mastering some of their first movie releases to DVD around the latter format's introduction in the US in 1997.

== See also ==
- Digital Betacam
- D-5 (Panasonic)
