= Symmetric Phase Recording =

Symmetric Phase Recording is a tape recording (computer storage media) technology developed by Quantum Corporation packs data across a tape's recording surface by writing adjacent tracks in a herringbone pattern:

track 0 = \\\\\, track 1 = /////, track 2 = \\\\\, track 3 = /////, etc. 

This eliminates crosstrack interference and guard bands so that more tracks of data can be stored on a tape.

== See also ==
- Azimuth recording, Slant Azimuth recording
- Digital Equipment Corporation
- Digital Linear Tape
- Linear Tape-Open
- Digital Tape Format
- Helical scan
- Magnetic tape
- Magnetic tape data storage
- Storage Technology Corporation
