= Digital-S =

Professional digital video cassette format

D-9 Videotape

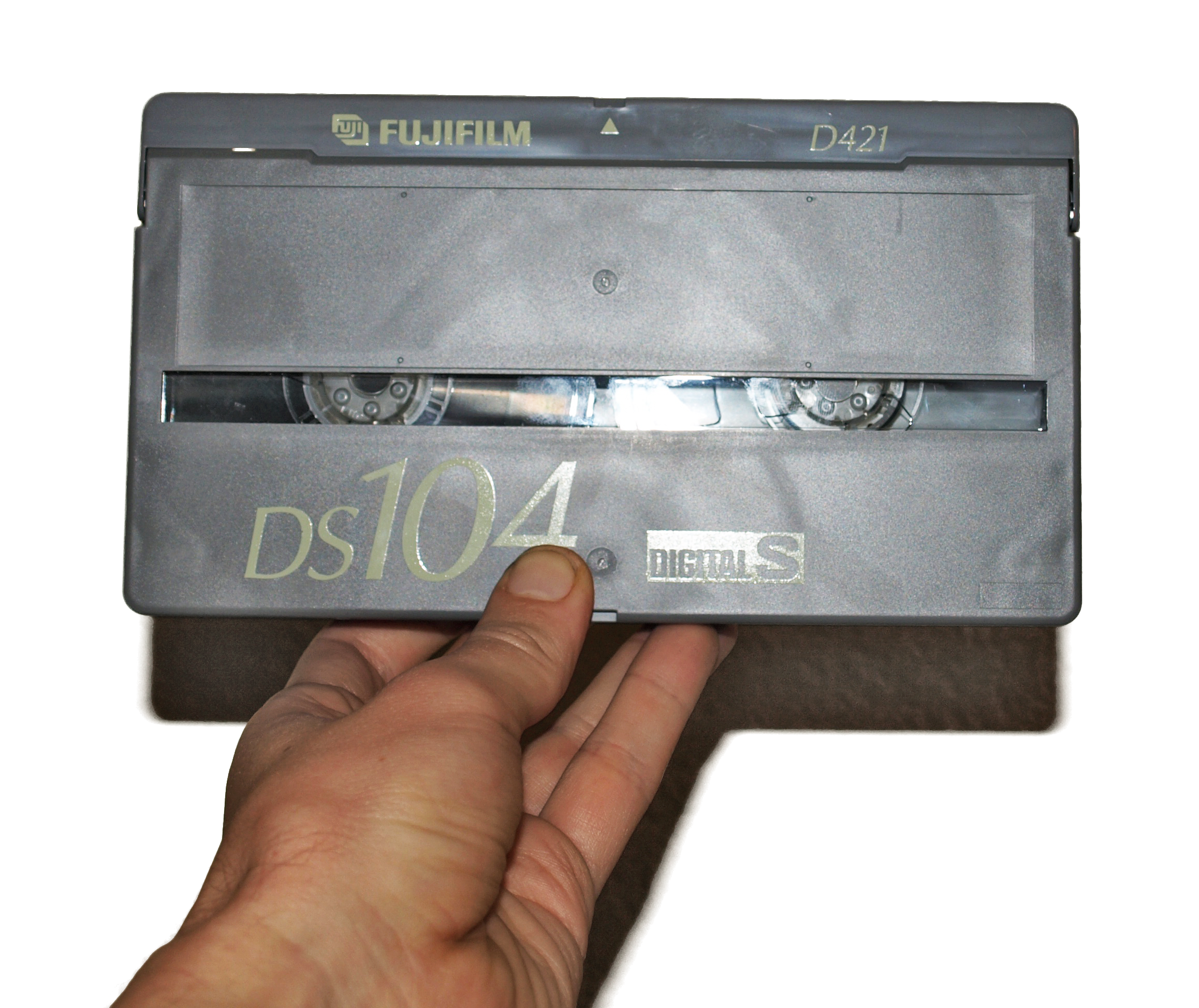
- D-9 Videotape
- Media type: Magnetic cassette tape
- Encoding: NTSC, PAL
- Standard: Interlaced video
- Usage: Video production
- Released: 1995; 31 years ago

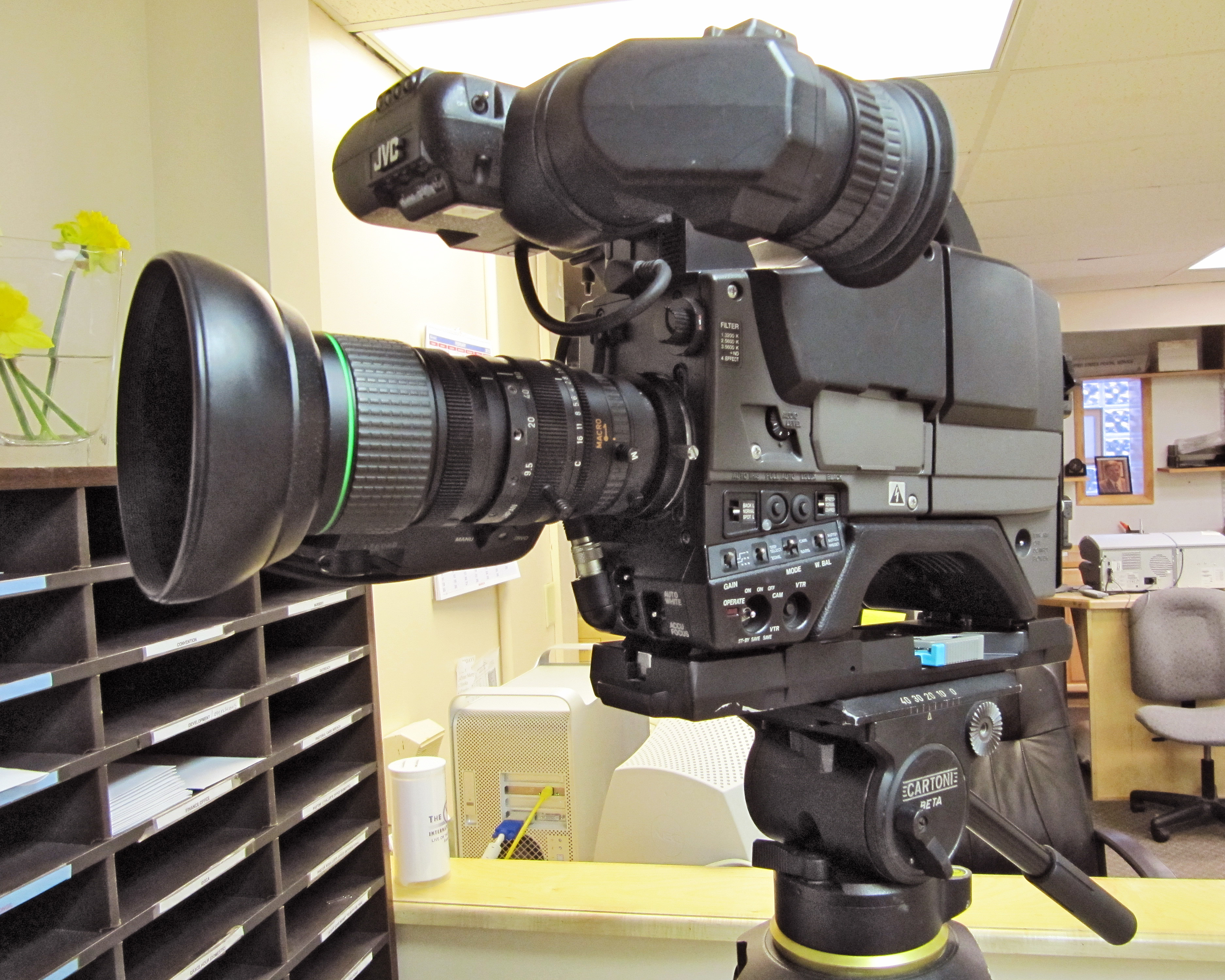
A JVC KY D29 Digital-S pro camcorder

Digital-S, later known as D-9, is a professional digital videocassette format created by JVC in 1995.

It is a direct competitor to Sony's Digital Betacam. Its name was changed to D-9 in 1999 by the SMPTE. It was used to a small extent in Europe and Asia and saw some use in the US, notably by the Fox News Channel, but was a commercial failure compared with Digital Betacam. It was superseded by high-definition tapeless formats.

== Technical details ==
The Digital-S tape itself uses a much higher quality metal particle formulation. The recording system is digital and for video uses DV compression at a 50 Mbit/s bitrate. Video is recorded in 4:2:2 component format at a variety of standard-definition resolutions, in either 4:3 or 16:9 aspect ratios. Audio is recorded as 16-bit/48 kHz PCM with up to four separate channels. The tape is 1/2 inch wide, the helical scan head drum is 62 mm in diameter, and the video tracks, which are read by the video heads in the head drum, are 20 microns wide. Video quality is generally very high; at standard definition, D-9's quality is comparable with Digital Betacam. The BR-D51U model is additionally capable of analogue S-VHS playback.

== HD recording ==
For high-definition video recording, JVC developed an extension to D-9 called D-9 HD, using twice the number of recording heads to record a 100 Mbit/s video bitstream at resolutions of 720p60, 1080i60 and 1080p24. This variant can also record 8 channels of PCM audio at 16 bits and 48 kHz. The higher data rate and increased tape speed mean that the recording time of any given cassette would be halved. D-9 HD, based on specifications, would have been higher quality than Sony HDCAM but lower than Sony HDCAM SR; no objective tests were made comparing these formats. With the exception of Fox's purchase of the format for "episodic television production" in 2001, the format has not seen much use in the professional realm.

== Additional information ==
Although D-9 uses the same video codec as DV, the video bitrate of D-9 is significantly higher than that of the prosumer format. DVCPRO achieves bitrate parity with D-9 and D-9 HD, but has a slower tape speed, making it less reliable. Some of the D-9 television studio gear is capable of recording with Sel-Sync or pre-read and is provided with four-channel audio like Digital Betacam. Serial digital interfaces (SDI) are also provided. A dockable recorder, the JVC BR-D40, attached to a variety of cameras, and there was a one-piece camcorder, the JVC DY-70U.
