= HDCAM =

Magnetic tape-based videocassette format for HD video

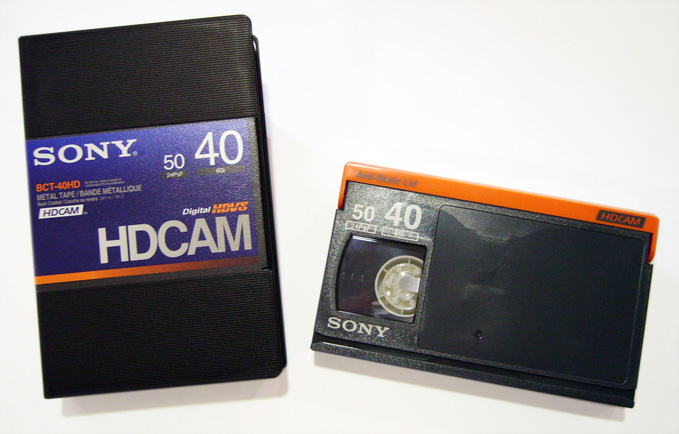
- HDCAM small videotape
- Media type: Magnetic tape, ½-inch
- Usage: Video production
- Released: 1997; 29 years ago

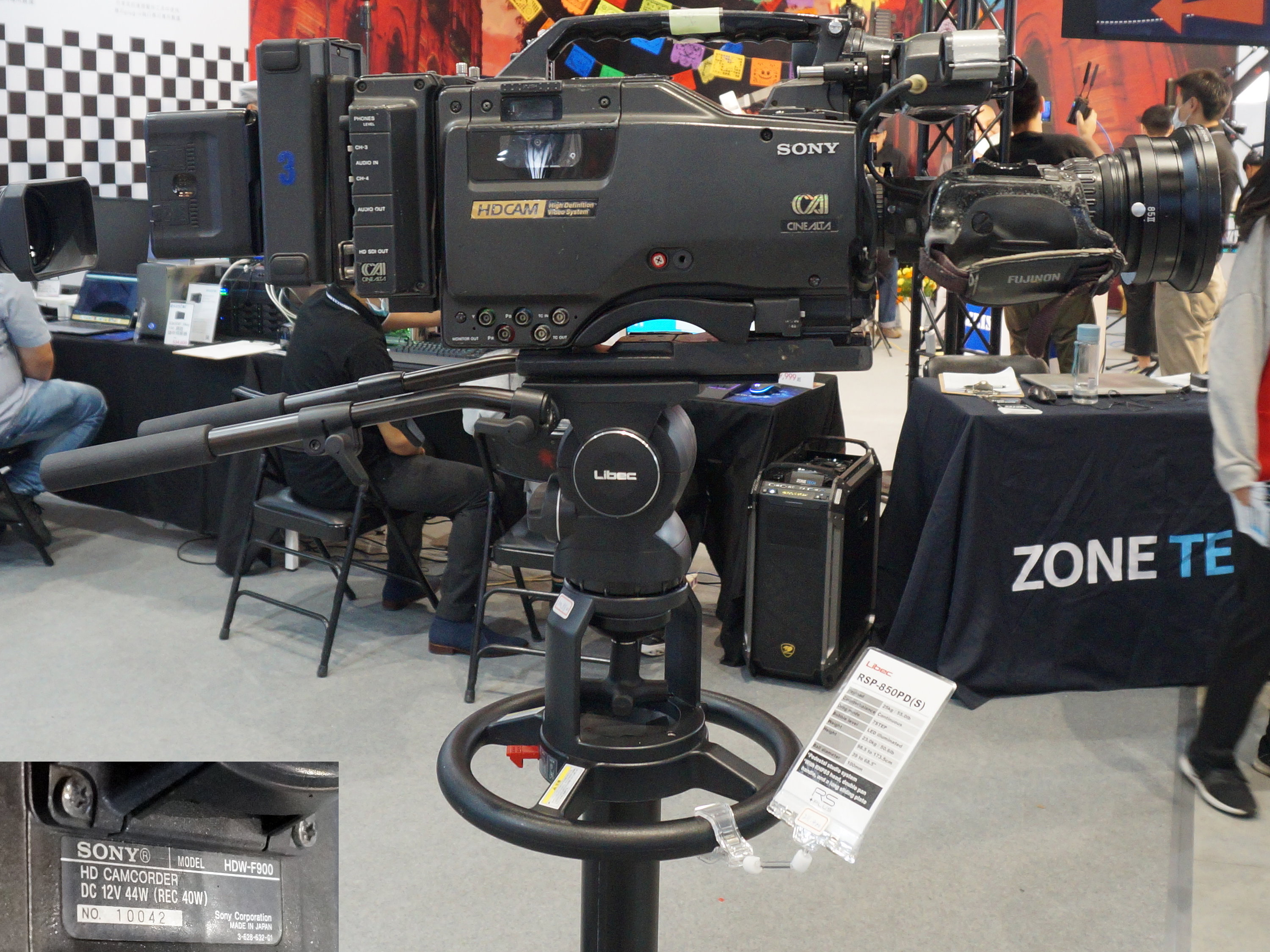
Sony HDW-F900 CineAlta HDCAM camcorder

HDCAM is a high-definition video digital recording videocassette version of Digital Betacam introduced in 1997 that uses an 8-bit discrete cosine transform (DCT) compressed 3:1:1 recording, in 1080i-compatible down-sampled resolution of 1440 × 1080, and adding 24p and 23.976 progressive segmented frame (PsF) modes to later models. The HDCAM codec uses rectangular pixels and as such the recorded 1440 × 1080 content is upsampled to 1920 × 1080 on playback. The recorded video bit rate is 144 Mbit/s. Audio is also similar, with four channels of AES3 20-bit, 48 kHz digital audio. Like Betacam, HDCAM tapes were produced in small and large cassette sizes; the small cassette uses the same form factor as the original Betamax. The main competitor to HDCAM was the DVCPRO HD format offered by Panasonic, which uses a similar compression scheme and bit rates ranging from 40 to 100 Mbit/s depending on frame rate.

HDCAM is standardized as SMPTE 367M, also known as SMPTE D-11. Like most videotape formats, HDCAM is no longer in widespread use, having been superseded by memory cards, disk-based recording formats, and SSDs.

In 2016, Sony ceased production of all half-inch videotape recorders and players, including HDCAM and HDCAM SR. It has ceased production of all blank half-inch tapes in 2023.

== SMPTE 367M ==
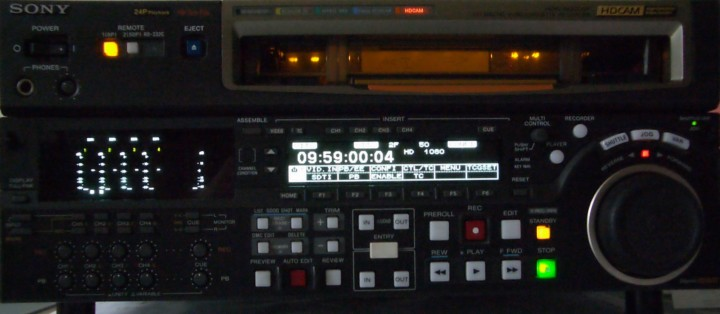
HDCAM deck

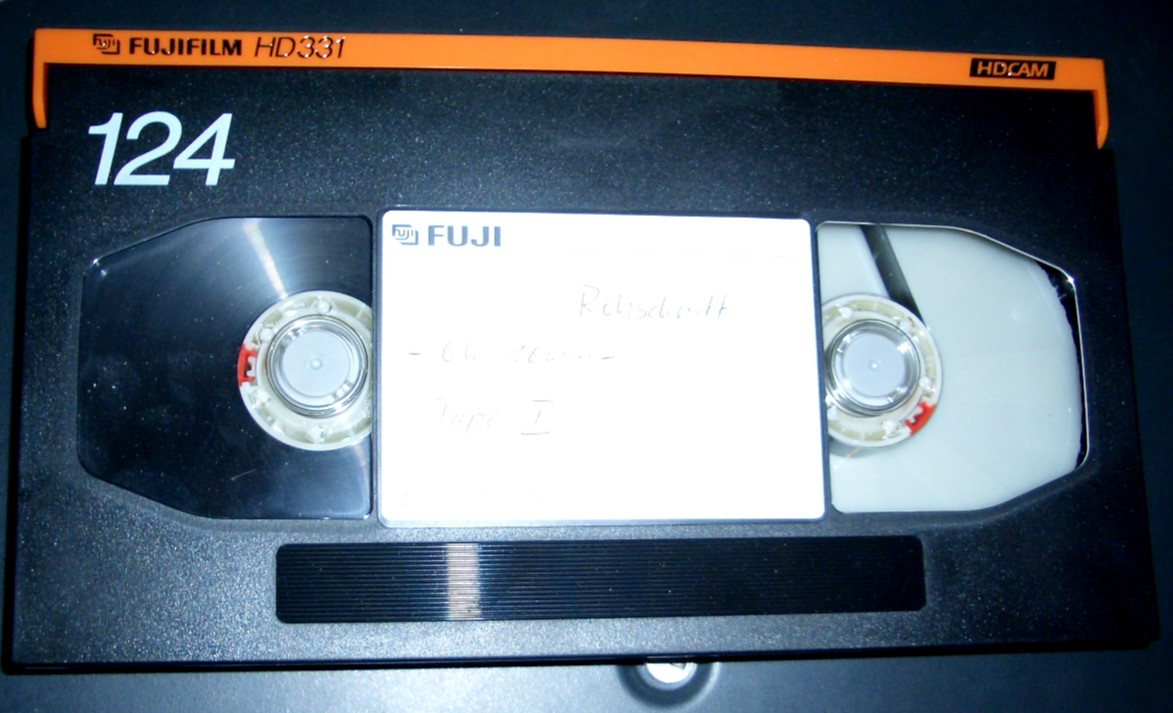
HDCAM L tape

SMPTE 367M, also known as SMPTE D-11, is the SMPTE standard for HDCAM. The standard specifies compression of high-definition digital video. D11 source picture rates can be 24, 24/1.001, 25 or 30/1.001 frames per second progressive scan, or 50 or 60/1.001 fields per second interlaced; compression yields output bit rates ranging from 112 to 140 Mbit/s. Each D11 source frame is composed of a luminance channel at 1920 × 1080 pixels and a chrominance channel at 960 × 1080 pixels. During compression, each frame's luminance channel is subsampled at 1440 × 1080, while the chrominance channel is subsampled at 480 × 1080, meaning 3:1:1 chroma subsampling. HDCAM supports recording at 24 FPS for film production applications, but it can be configured for television production. Similar to MPEG IMX, the helical scan head drum is 80 mm in diameter. The helical tracks read by the video heads in the drum, are 22 μm wide. The video heads have a 15.25° azimuth. Audio is also recorded on the helical tracks.

== HDCAM SR ==
Logo of HDCAM SR

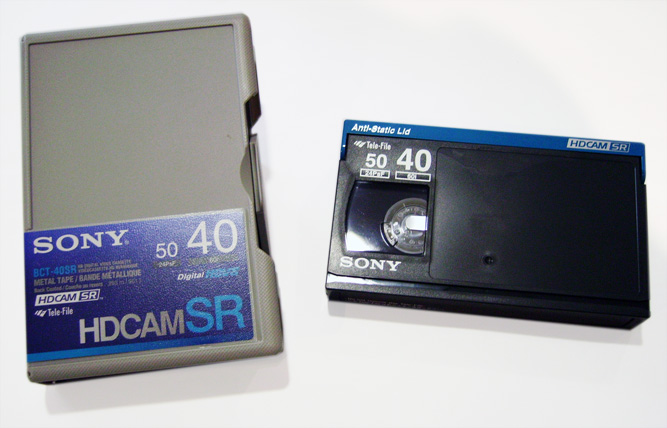
HDCAM SR small tape

HDCAM SR was introduced in 2003 and standardised in SMPTE 409M-2005. It uses a higher particle density tape and is capable of recording in 10 bits 4:2:2 or 4:4:4 RGB with a video bit rate of 440 Mbit/s, and a total data rate of approximately 600 Mbit/s. The increased bit rate (over HDCAM) allows HDCAM SR to capture much more of the full bandwidth of the HD-SDI signal (1920 × 1080). Some HDCAM SR VTRs can also use a 2× mode with an even higher video bit rate of 990 Mbit/s, allowing for a single 4:4:4 stream at a lower compression or two 4:2:2 video streams simultaneously. HDCAM SR uses MPEG-4 Part 2 Simple Studio Profile for compression, and expands the number of audio channels up to 12 at 24-bit, 48 kHz. Each channel is capable of recording AES3 non-audio data.

HDCAM SR was used commonly for HDTV television production. In the mid-2000s, many prime-time network television shows used HDCAM SR as a master recording medium, but it is no longer in widespread use. HDCAM SR storage media production was paused for five months after the 2011 Tōhoku earthquake and tsunami damaged the only Sony factory producing it, which triggered some migration away from the format. Production of HDCAM SR media ceased in 2023.

Some HDCAM VTRs play back older Betacam variants. For example, the Sony SRW-5500 HDCAM SR recorder plays back and records HDCAM and HDCAM SR tapes, and with optional hardware also plays and upconverts Digital Betacam tapes to HD format. Tape lengths are the same as for Digital Betacam, up to 40 minutes for S and 124 minutes for L tapes. In 24p mode the runtime increases to 50 and 155 minutes, respectively.

HDCAM tapes are black with an orange lid, and HDCAM SR tapes black with a cyan lid.

440 Mbit/s mode is known as SQ, and 880 Mbit/s mode is known as HQ.

Sony also announced a higher compression mode called SR Lite. As with the 440 and 880 mode, SR Lite utilizes the MPEG-4 Part 2 Simple Studio Profile but decreases the bit rate to 220 Mbit/s for 60i and 183 Mbit/s for 50i. SR Lite is locked at 4:2:2 color sampling but still maintains 10 bit pixel depth. It also allows for 50 and 60p at the cost of a doubled data rate (440 Mbit/s for 60p).

The Sony SRW-5800 HDCAM SR VTR has the ability to record both the left eye and right eye of 3D content to a single tape. It syncs the two eyes together and takes up twice as much space on the tape as a normal recording. Other HDSR decks also support 3D such as the SRW-1 HDCAM SR Portable VTR and the SRW-5500/5000 which can play back either channel A or channel B of the Dual Stream 4:2:2 recording.

== See also ==
- Sony HDVS
- HDV
- XDCAM
- AVCHD
- XAVC
- DVCPRO HD
- D5 HD
- D6 HDTV VTR
