= D-5 (Panasonic) =

Magnetic tape-based videocassette format

D-5 videotape
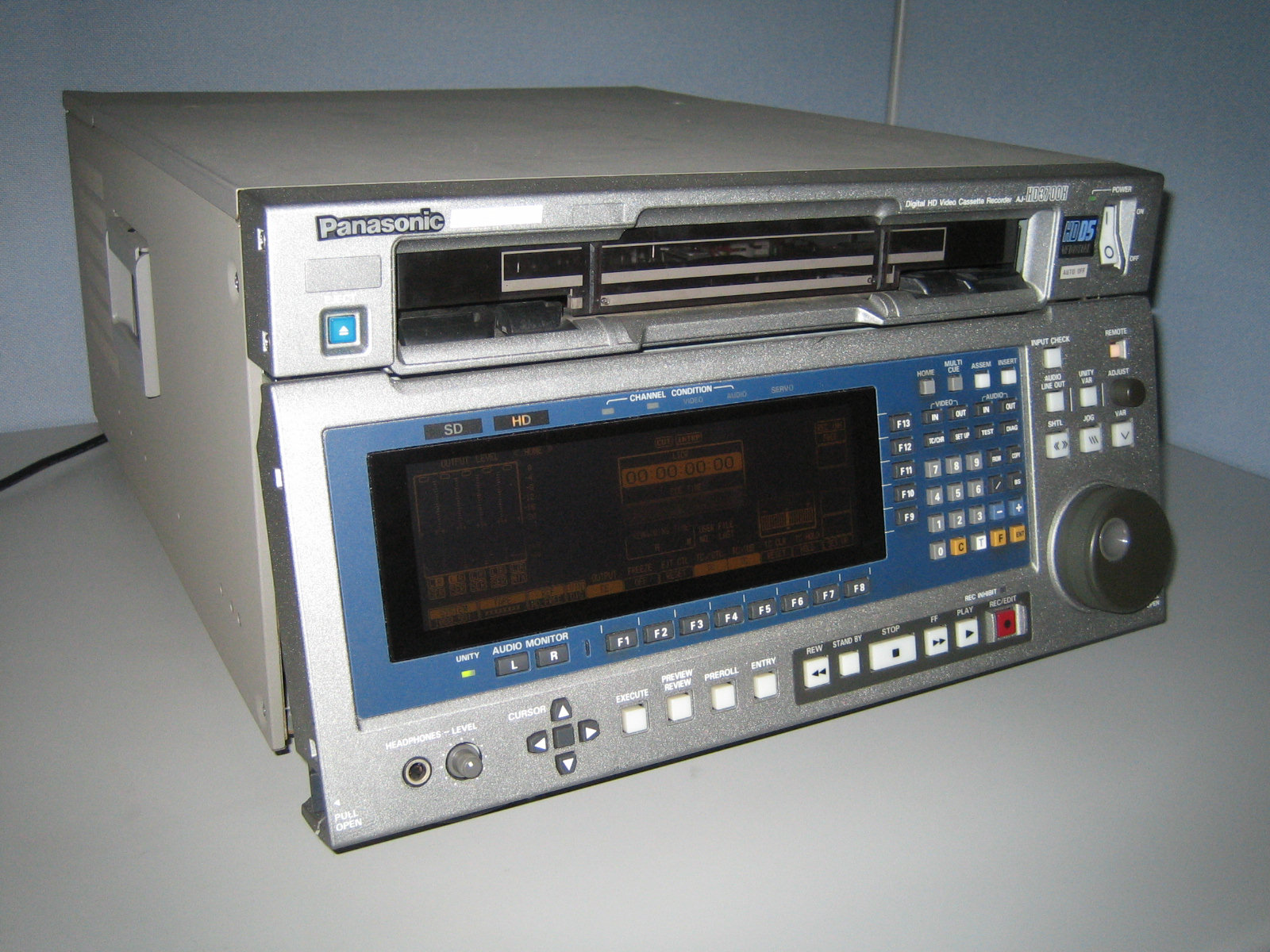
- Panasonic D-5 HD VTR AJ-HD3700H
- Media type: Magnetic tape
- Encoding: NTSC, PAL
- Read mechanism: Helical scan
- Write mechanism: Helical scan
- Standard: Interlaced video
- Developed by: Panasonic
- Usage: Television production
- Extended from: D-3
- Released: 1993; 32 years ago

D-5 is a professional digital video format introduced by Panasonic at 18th International Television Symposium in Montreux in 1993 and released a year later in 1994.

== Overview ==
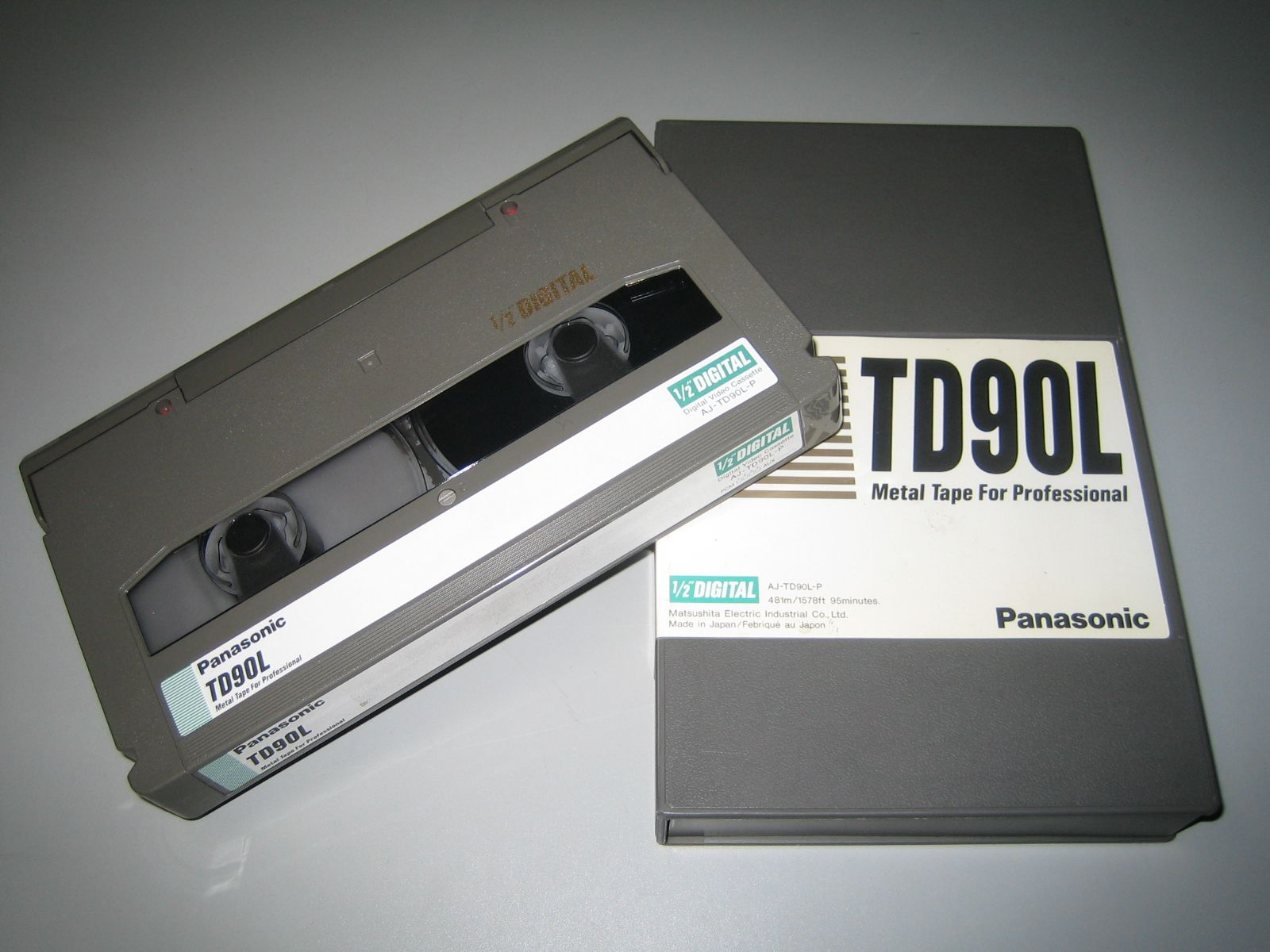
A cassette tape for D-3 and D-5 (Medium)

Like Sony's D-1 (8-bit), it is an uncompressed digital component system (10-bit), but uses the same half-inch tapes as Panasonic's digital composite D-3 format. A 120 min. D-3 tape will record 60 min. in D-5/D-5 HD mode. D-5 standard definition (SD) decks can be retrofitted to record high definition with the use of an external HD input/output box/decoder. There were native D5 HD decks as well that didn't need an external processor and could record in both SD and HD. High definition conversion on D5 HD decks does not allow for any error correction that exists on standard definition recordings, as the full bandwidth of the tape is required for high definition recording.

== D-5 HD ==
D-5 HD uses standard D-3/D-5 videocassettes to record HD material, using an intra-frame compression with a 4:1 ratio. It was introduced in 1994. D-5 HD supports the 1080 and the 1035 interlaced line standards at both 60 Hz and 59.94 Hz field rates, all 720 progressive line standards and the 1080 progressive line standard at 24, 25 and 30 frame rates. Four 48 kHz 24-bit PCM audio channels, or eight 48 kHz 20-bit channels, are also supported. D-5 runs at different data rates for different formats:

- 323 Mbit/s (1080/59.94i/8CH, 720/59.94p/8CH, 480/59.94i/8CH)
- 319 Mbit/s (576/50i/8CH)
- 300 Mbit/s (1080/59.94i/4CH, 720/59.94p/4CH, 480/59.94i/4CH)
- 258 Mbit/s (1080/23.98p/8CH, 1080/24p/8CH)
- 269 Mbit/s (1080/50i/8CH, 1080/25p/8CH, 576/50i/4CH)

HD material is often captured for post production of film projects, whereby the D-5 HD scanning equipment is cheaper by the hour than a full resolution 2K film scan.

As of 2010, no D-5 HD camcorders have been offered for sale. Panasonic instead markets P2 camcorders for field production of 720p or 1080i and 1080p images.

In 2007, Panasonic introduced an add-on box (AJ-HDP2000) that allows a standard D-5 VTR to encode 2K (2048 x 1080) resolution material with 4:4:4 color space onto D-5 tape using the industry standard JPEG2000 wavelet-based compression.

== See also ==
- D-VHS
- W-VHS
- Digital Betacam
- DCT (videocassette format)
- D6 HDTV VTR
- HDCAM (D-11)
- DVCPRO HD (D-12)
