= Magnetic tape =

Data recording made of plastic film

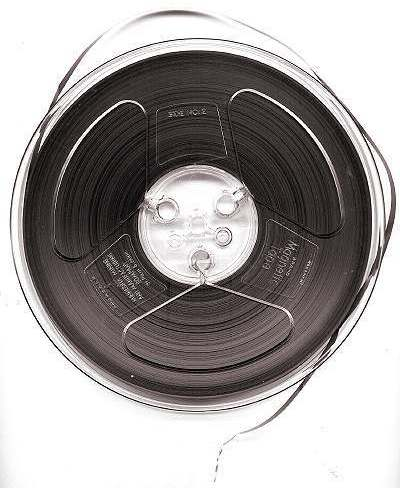
7-inch reel of ¼-inch-wide audio recording tape, typical of consumer use in the 1950s–70s

Magnetic tape is a medium for magnetic storage made of a thin, magnetizable coating on a long, narrow strip of plastic film. It was developed in Germany in 1928, based on the earlier magnetic wire recording from Denmark. Devices that use magnetic tape can record and play back audio, visual, and digital computer data.

Magnetic tape revolutionized sound recording and reproduction and broadcasting. It allowed radio, which had always been broadcast live, to be recorded for later or repeated airing. Since the early 1950s, magnetic tape has been used with computers to store data and is still used for backup purposes.

Magnetic tape begins to degrade after 10–20 years and, therefore, is not an ideal medium for long-term archival storage. The exception is data tape formats like LTO which are specifically designed for long-term archiving.

Information in magnetic tapes is often recorded in tracks, which are narrow, separate areas of information recorded magnetically onto the tape. Tracks are often parallel to the length of the tape, in which case they are known as longitudinal tracks, or diagonal relative to the length of the tape in helical scan. There are also transverse scan and arcuate scanning, used in Quadruplex videotape. Azimuth recording is used to reduce crosstalk between adjacent tracks.

== Durability ==
While good for short-term use, magnetic tape is highly prone to disintegration. Depending on the environment, this process may begin after 10–20 years.

Over time, magnetic tape made in the 1970s and 1980s can suffer from a type of deterioration called sticky-shed syndrome. It is caused by hydrolysis of the binder in the tape and can render the tape unusable, but which can be treated by "baking" the tape at low temperature to remove binder layer moisture. This is generally a temporary treatment that allows the information recorded on the tape to be promptly read back and transcribed to other media, but does not stabilize the tape in the long term.

== Successors ==
Since the introduction of magnetic tape, other technologies have been developed that can perform the same functions, and therefore, replace it. Such as for example, hard disk drives in computers replacing cassette tape readers, such as the Atari Program Recorder and the Commodore Datasette for software, CDs and MiniDiscs replacing cassette tapes for audio, and DVDs replacing VHS tapes. Despite this, technological innovation continues. As of 2014 Sony and IBM continue to advance tape capacity.

== Uses ==
=== Audio ===
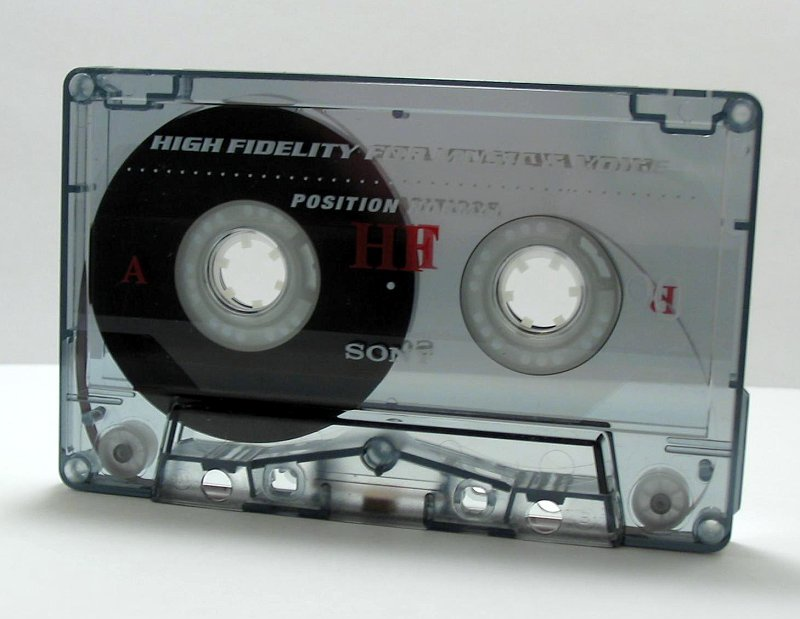
Compact Cassette

Magnetic tape was invented for recording sound by Fritz Pfleumer in 1928 in Germany.

Because of escalating political tensions and the outbreak of World War II, these developments in Germany were largely kept secret. Although the Allies knew from their monitoring of Nazi radio broadcasts that the Germans had some new form of recording technology, its nature was not discovered until the Allies acquired German recording equipment as they invaded Europe at the end of the war. It was only after the war that Americans, particularly Jack Mullin, John Herbert Orr, and Richard H. Ranger, were able to bring this technology out of Germany and develop it into commercially viable formats. Bing Crosby, an early adopter of the technology, made a large investment in the tape hardware manufacturer Ampex.

A wide variety of audiotape recorders and formats have been developed since. Some magnetic tape-based formats include:

- Reel-to-reel
- Fidelipac
- Stereo-Pak (Muntz Stereo-Pak, commonly known as the 4-track cartridge)
- Perforated (sprocketed) film audio magnetic tape (sepmag, perfotape, sound follower tape, magnetic film)
- 8-track tape
- Compact Cassette
- Elcaset
- RCA tape cartridge
- Mini-Cassette
- Microcassette
- Picocassette
- NT (cassette)
- ProDigi
- Digital Audio Stationary Head
- Digital Audio Tape
- Digital Compact Cassette

=== Video ===
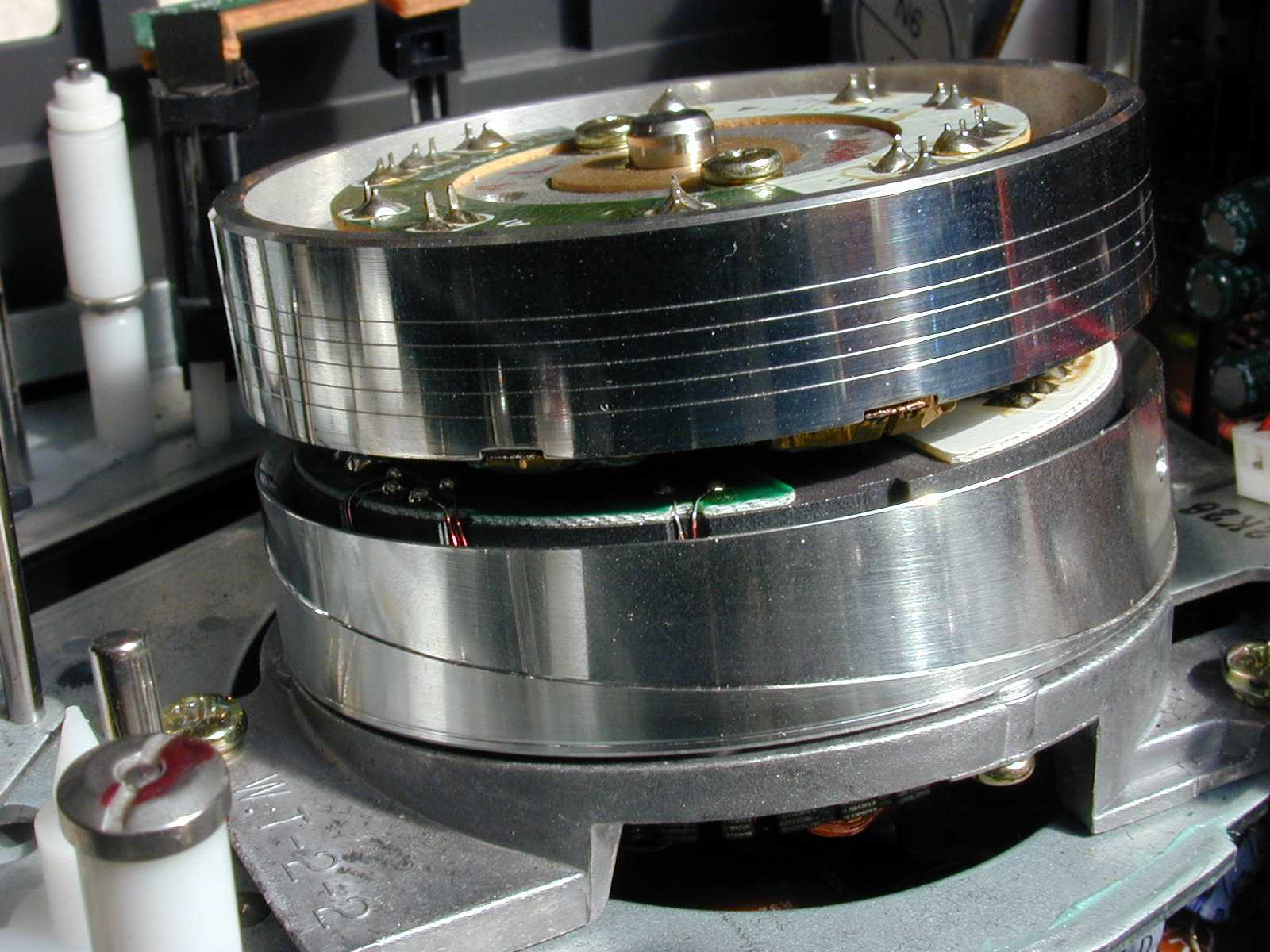
A VHS helical scan head drum. Helical and transverse scans made it possible to increase the data bandwidth to the necessary point for recording video on tapes, and not just audio.

Videotape is magnetic tape used for storing video and usually sound in addition. Information stored can be in the form of either an analog or digital signal. Videotape is used in both video tape recorders (VTRs) and, more commonly, videocassette recorders (VCRs) and camcorders. Videotapes have also been used for storing scientific or medical data, such as the data produced by an electrocardiogram.

Some magnetic tape-based formats include:

- Quadruplex videotape
- Ampex 2-inch helical VTR
- Type A videotape
- IVC videotape format
- Type B videotape
- Type C videotape
- EIAJ-1
- U-matic
- Video Cassette Recording
- Cartrivision
- VHS
  - VHS-C
  - S-VHS
    - Digital S
    - W-VHS
    - D-VHS
- Video 2000
- V-Cord
- VX (videocassette format)
- Betamax
- Compact Video Cassette
- Betacam
  - Betacam SP
  - Digital Betacam
  - Betacam SX
    - MPEG IMX
  - HDCAM
    - HDCAM SR
- M (videocassette format)
- MII (videocassette format)
  - UniHi
- D-1 (Sony)
- DCT (videocassette format)
- D-2 (video)
- D-3 (video)
- D5 HD
- D6 HDTV VTR
- Video8
- Hi8
- Digital8
- DV
  - MiniDV
  - DVCAM
    - DVCPRO
    - DVCPRO50
    - DVCPRO Progressive
    - DVCPRO HD
  - HDV
- MicroMV

=== Computer data ===
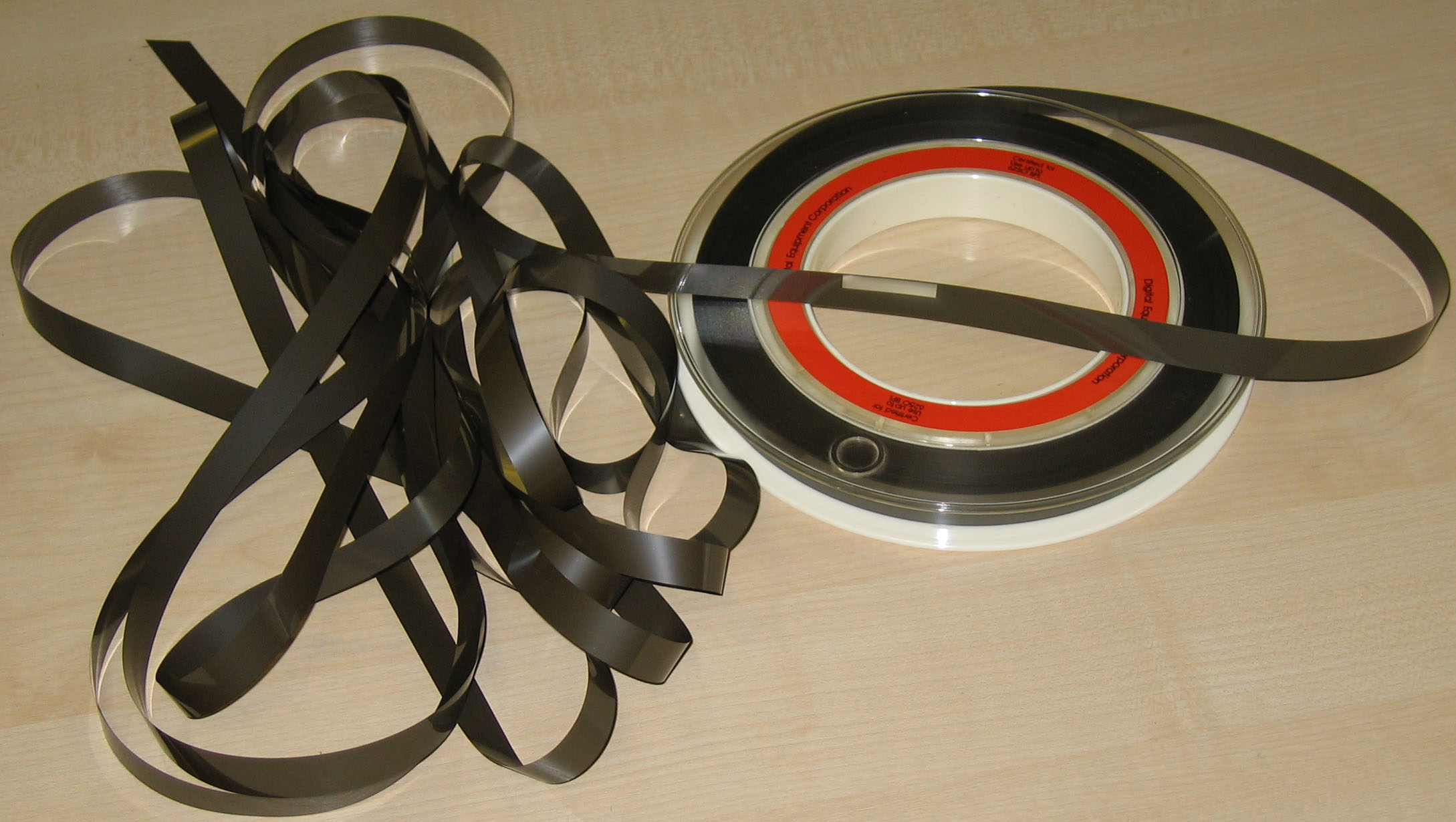
Small open reel of 9-track tape

Magnetic-tape data storage is a system for storing digital information on magnetic tape using digital recording. Commercial magnetic tape products used for data storage were first released in the 1950s and have continued to be developed and released to the present day.

Tape was an important medium for primary data storage in early computers, typically using large open reels of 7-track, later 9-track tape. Modern magnetic tape is most commonly packaged in cartridges and cassettes, such as the widely supported Linear Tape-Open (LTO) and IBM 3592 series. The device that performs the writing or reading of data is called a tape drive. Autoloaders and tape libraries are often used to automate cartridge handling and exchange. Compatibility was important to enable transferring data.

Tape data storage is now used more for system backup, data archive and data exchange. The low cost of tape has kept it viable for long-term storage and archive.

== See also ==
- Analog recording
- Magnetic developer
- Print-through – Transfer of content between magnetic tape layers
- List of magnetic tape cartridges and cassettes
