= D-3 (video) =

Videocassette format

D-3 videotape
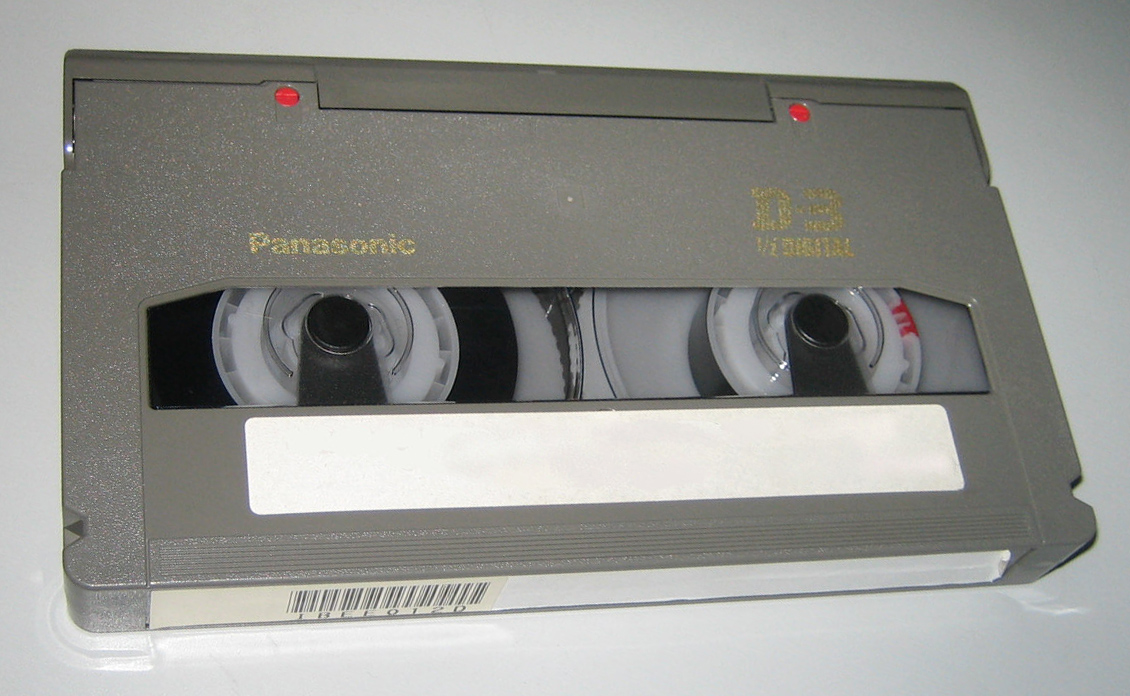
- A D-3 videocassette
- Media type: Magnetic tape
- Encoding: NTSC, PAL
- Read mechanism: Helical scan
- Write mechanism: Helical scan
- Standard: Interlaced video
- Developed by: NHK
- Usage: Television production
- Extended to: D-5
- Released: 1991; 35 years ago

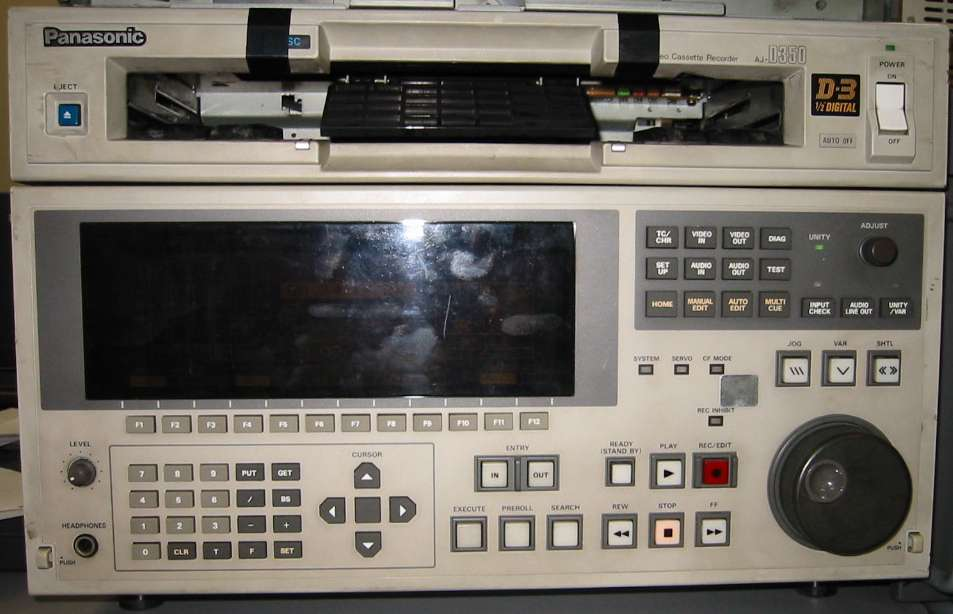
Panasonic AJ-D350 D3 VCR

D-3 is an uncompressed composite digital video format invented at NHK and introduced commercially by Panasonic. It was launched in 1991 to compete with Ampex's D-2.

== Overview ==
D-3 uses 0.5-inch (13 mm) metal particle tape at 83.88 millimetres per second (3.302 in/s) (compare to D-2's 19 millimetres [0.75 in] and 131.7 millimetres per second [5.19 in/s]). Like D-2, the composite video signal is sampled at four times the color subcarrier frequency, with eight bits per sample. Four channels of 48 kHz 16–20 bit PCM audio, and other ancillary data, are inserted during the vertical blanking interval. The aggregate net (error corrected) bitrate of the format is 143 Mbit/s, and because the codec is lossless, it has been used in data applications.

Camcorders were available which used this format, and are to date the only digital tape camcorders to use a lossless encoding scheme. The D-5 digital component video format, introduced in 1993 by Panasonic, uses the D-3 transport and tape running at roughly double D-3 speed. The D-3 transport in turn is derived from the MII transport. D-3/D-5 tapes come in small (161 by 96 by 25 millimetres [6.34 in × 3.78 in × 0.98 in]), medium (212 by 124 by 25 millimetres [8.35 in × 4.88 in × 0.98 in]), and large (296 by 167 by 25 millimetres [11.65 in × 6.57 in × 0.98 in]) cassettes, with format-specific recognition holes. Maximum D-3 runtimes (in the Fujifilm lineup) are 50, 126, and 248 minutes.

The D-3 format is now regarded as obsolete. In the early 1990s the BBC embarked on a massive project to copy its older video tapes onto D-3 for archival, but the D-3 cassettes themselves have become obsolete and are being transferred to modern digital video standards. There is doubt over whether the surviving D-3 machines will last long enough to play the 340,000 tapes which the corporation holds.
