= Azimuth recording =

Use of a variation in angle between two recording heads on magnetic tape

Azimuth recording is the use of a variation in angle between two recording heads that are recording data so close together on magnetic tape that crosstalk would otherwise likely occur. Normally, the head is perpendicular to the movement of the tape, and this is considered zero degrees. However, if the heads are mounted at slightly different angles (such as ±7 degrees in VHS), destructive interference will occur at high frequencies when reading data recorded in the cross-talking channel but not in the channel that is intended to be read. At low frequencies relative to the maximum allowed by the head gap, however, this technique is ineffective. Thus one head is slanted slightly leftwards and the magnetic gap of the other head slanted slightly rightwards.

To look at it another way, channel A sees the channel B data stretched out in time, hence the technique has a low-pass effect on noise intruding from another channel.

Every videotape system was designed to put as much video as possible onto a given-sized tape, but information from one recording track (pass of the video head) must not interfere with information on adjacent stripes. Using slant azimuth recording, the need for guard bands, that is the blank space between tracks, is eliminated, allowing more recording to be placed on a given length of tape.

All the early low-end reel-to-reel VTR machines and the first VCR cassette formats, the Philips N1500 and the Sony U-matic, used this system. Later, the JVC VHS and the Sony Betamax used slant azimuth recording also. Digital VTR formats used azimuth recording as well.

== See also ==
- Symmetric Phase Recording
- VTR
- Tape head
- Helical scan
- Slant azimuth recording
- Betamax
