= D-2 (video) =

Professional digital videocassette format

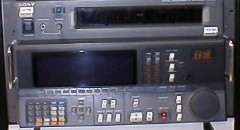
- Sony D-2 VCR
- Media type: Magnetic tape, ¾-inch
- Encoding: digital composite video
- Read mechanism: Helical scan
- Write mechanism: Helical scan
- Standard: interlaced (NTSC, PAL)
- Developed by: Ampex/Sony
- Usage: Video production
- Released: 1988; 38 years ago

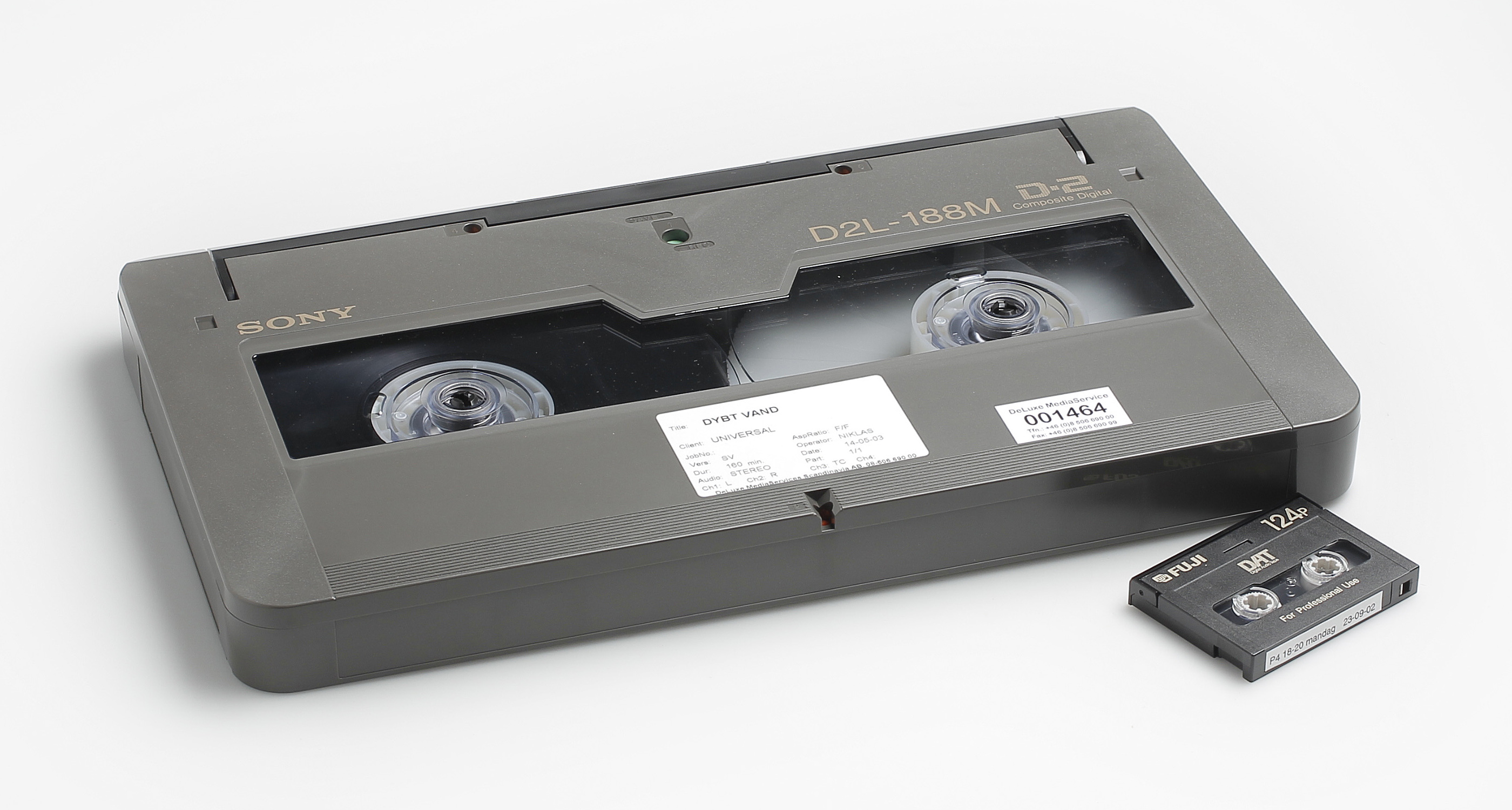
A D-2 tape compared to a Digital Audio Tape

D-2 is a professional digital videocassette format created by Ampex and introduced in 1988 at the NAB Show as a composite video alternative to the component video D-1 format. It garnered Ampex a technical Emmy in 1989. Like D-1, D-2 stores uncompressed digital video on a tape cassette; however, it stores a composite video signal, rather than component video as with D-1. While component video is superior for advanced editing, especially when chroma key effects are used, composite video was more compatible with most analog facilities existing at the time.

== History ==
Ampex created the first D-2 video machine, the ACR-225 commercial spot player working with Sony, who had done some early research into composite digital video, as a cost-effective solution for TV broadcasters with large investments in composite analog infrastructure such as video routers and switchers, since it could be inserted into existing analog broadcast facilities without extensive redesign or modifications. This was because D-2 machines accepted standard analog video and audio inputs and outputs. D-2 machines are capable of interfacing through either serial digital video or analog video connections. Four PCM audio channels are available for editing (an improvement over the then-popular Type C analog machines with two audio channels) as well as an analog cue channel and timecode, also with AES3 or analog connections.

== Features ==
Like D-1, D-2 uses 19 mm (¾ inch) tape loaded into three different-sized videocassettes to support commercial spot playback as well as long-form programming such as movies. Although D-2 videocassette housings are nearly identical to their D-1 counterparts, they are not interchangeable due to D-2's metal particle tape formula, needed for its higher recording density.

Ampex D-2 tape transports are extremely fast. A high-speed search at 60 times playback speed with a recognizable color picture allowed three hours of videotape to be searched through in approximately three minutes.

The format uses helical scan, with an M wrap pattern in which the tape is wrapped around the head drum around the left and right side. This records diagonal tracks, called helical tracks, using heads mounted on the drum which rotates at high speed. Both audio and video are recorded on the helical tracks.

The D-2 offered read before write or preread functionality, which allowed simultaneous playback and recording on the same transport. For example, a title could be superimposed over existing video already on the same video tape by playing the tape through a video switcher, adding the title, and recording the new composite image back onto the same location of the tape. This eliminated the need for an additional recorder and saved considerable time in video editing. Steven Fuiten was the first PreRead Editor to composite video using a full D2 digital system.

== Acceptance ==
During its early stages, finished episodes of South Park were hastily recorded to D-2 to be sent to Comedy Central for airing in just a few days' time. D-2 replaced Type C videotape for the mastering of LaserDiscs in the late 1980s.

D-2 was also used to send at least some episodes of Mystery Science Theater 3000 to Comedy Central for playback.

D-2 was in widespread use for some ten years, as the computer-based video server (with fewer moving parts and correspondingly greater reliability) became available not long after its release. By 2003, only a handful of broadcasters continued to use the D-2 format, and even then only to access materials recorded on the format.

Panasonic introduced D-3 in 1991; it is very similar to D-2 as it uses a smaller cassette case.

== Format Description ==
- General:
  - Format name: D2 digital
  - SMPTE type: D2
  - Format type: digital composite
  - Scanning system: multi head segmented helical
  - Year introduced: 1988
  - Developer: Ampex/Sony
- Physical Data:
  - Tape width: 19 mm
  - Tape speed(s): 131.826 mm/s
  - Tape thickness: 0.01397 mm
  - Playing time(s): 32, 94, 208 minutes (Small, Medium, Large cassette sizes)
  - Headwheel (head drum) diameter: 96.4 mm
  - Helical track width: 35.2 μm
  - Speed: 7200 rpm
  - Head-to-tape writing speed: 27381.2 mm/s (?)
  - Sampling rate: 4 fsc (14.31818 MHz for NTSC)
  - No. of bits: 8
  - Data rate: 60.1 MB/s (480.8 Mbps)
- Audio:
  - No. of digital channels: 4
  - Sampling rate: 48 kHz
  - No. of bits: 20

== Models ==
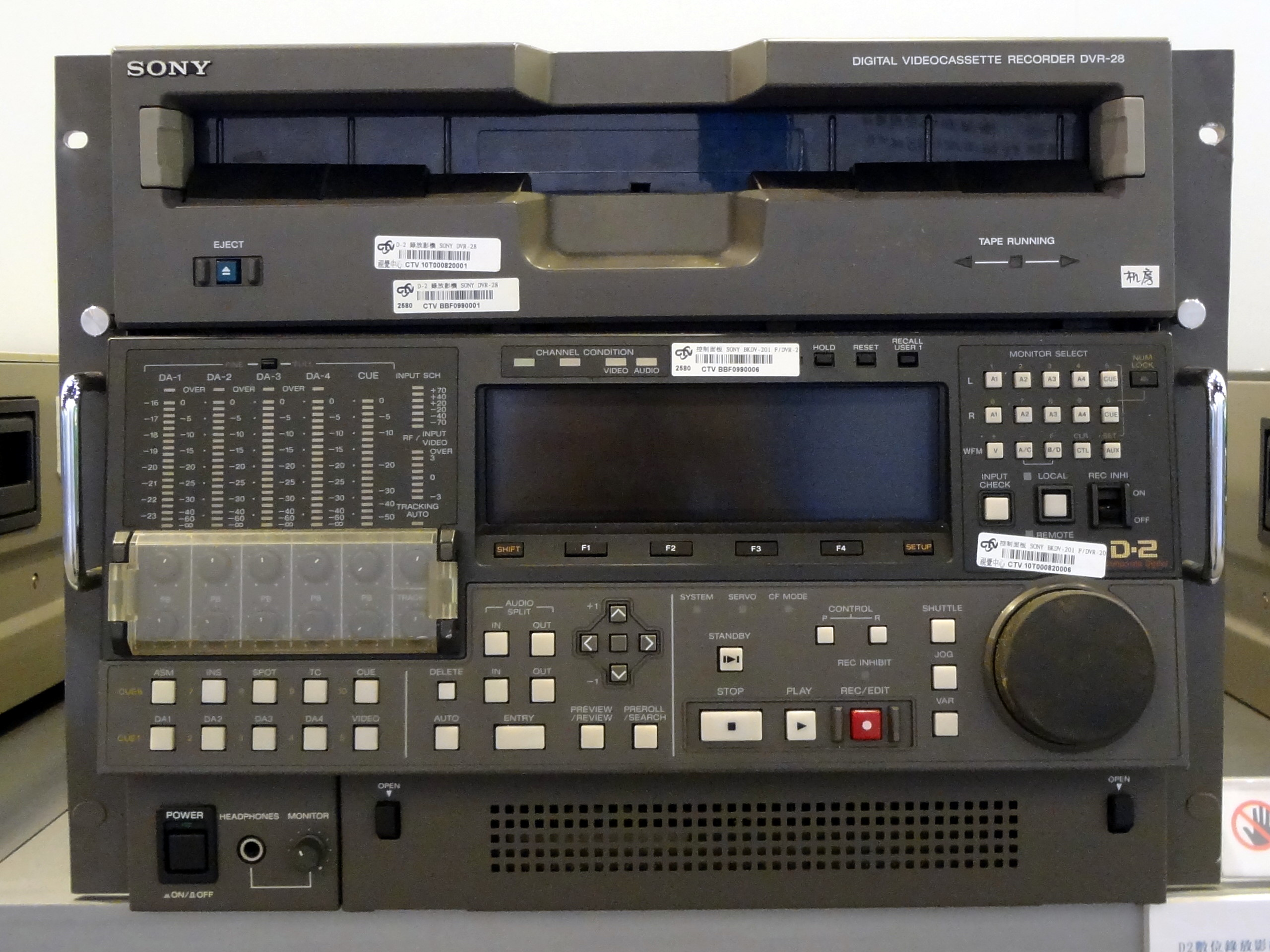
Sony DVR-28

- Ampex
  - VPR-200, VPR-250, VPR-300
  - ACR-225 Commercial Spot Player (robotic tape system)
- Sony
  - DVR-10, DVR-18, DVR-20, DVR-28
  - DCR-10, DCR-18, DCR-20, DCR-28 (sold by BTS)
  - DVC 80, DVC 1000s LMS (Library Management System)
