= John Herbert Orr =

American recording tape innovator and entrepreneur (1911–1984)

John Herbert Orr (August 19, 1911 – May 6, 1984) was an Alabama entrepreneur who formed Orradio Industries, Inc., a high-technology firm that manufactured magnetic recording tape for both professional and consumer markets. He also founded OrrTronics, which invented the endless loop tape cartridge.

In 1945, Orr was among the U.S. Army Intelligence officials who investigated this technology, which was originally developed in Germany during the 1930s. According to one story, in 1945, General Dwight D. Eisenhower wanted to record a message to the German people, which he did using captured German tape. However, the tape had not been completely erased, and Hitler's voice, so the story goes, could be heard intermittently along with that of Eisenhower. Eisenhower ordered that no more captured tape could be used, and ordered Major John Herbert Orr to use captured German scientists to set up an American tape manufacturing facility. Paper tape was the medium in use at the time, but the German engineers had been experimenting with a plastic based tape; they provided Major Orr with the data on this and it became the basis of the modern audio and video recording industry. When the German engineers gave Orr their studies on plastic tape, the only place in Europe manufacturing the material was a factory making ladies imitation leather purses.

Orr's early knowledge allowed him to establish Orradio in 1949. When, after some uncertainty, magnetic tape became the standard medium for tape recorders, and as other uses such as data storage and videotape appeared, Orradio's sales expanded rapidly in the late 1950s. Orradio produced the first commercially available audio tape, video tape, and computer tape in the world. The company was purchased by a larger competitor, the Ampex Corporation, in 1959 when Ampex decided it was cheaper to own the plant than to keep buying all their tape. Ampex spun off its magnetic tape division in 1995 as Quantegy and merged with magnetic tape division of 3M a year later.

Orr then founded OrrTronics, which developed the lubricated tape used in closed loop tape systems, also called endless tape cartridge. The system, called the "Orrtronic Tapette", was produced in versions for home, commercial, and automotive use, and was offered as a prize on television game shows. Evolving from a single track mono design (which stayed in production as the radio station "cart") through two-track mono and stereo versions.

OrrTronics was then sold to Delco Battery and Orr formed Orrox Corporation, which specialized in hard disc drive controllers, refurbishing of Quadruplex videotape recorder heads, and computerized video tape editing systems for TV broadcasters and post-production houses. The latter product, CMX Systems, was for many years the preferred editing system for 80% of all television programming originating on videotape.

Orr retired from Orrox in 1976 and founded Orr Proprietorship, which transcribed recorded media, from early cylinder recordings to 1960s tape recordings, onto modern tape for preservation.

Orr died of a heart attack in 1984 while on a Sunday afternoon drive with his sister.

In 2005, a segment in the PBS series History Detectives (Car Tape Deck, Season 3, Episode 6) featured Orr and his contribution to the early magnetic tape industry.

== See also ==
- Jack Mullin - Another American magnetic tape pioneer.
- Richard H. Ranger - Another American magnetic tape pioneer.
- WJHO - Radio station initially licensed to Opelika, Alabama
