= Type C videotape =

Broadcast magnetic tape-based videotape format

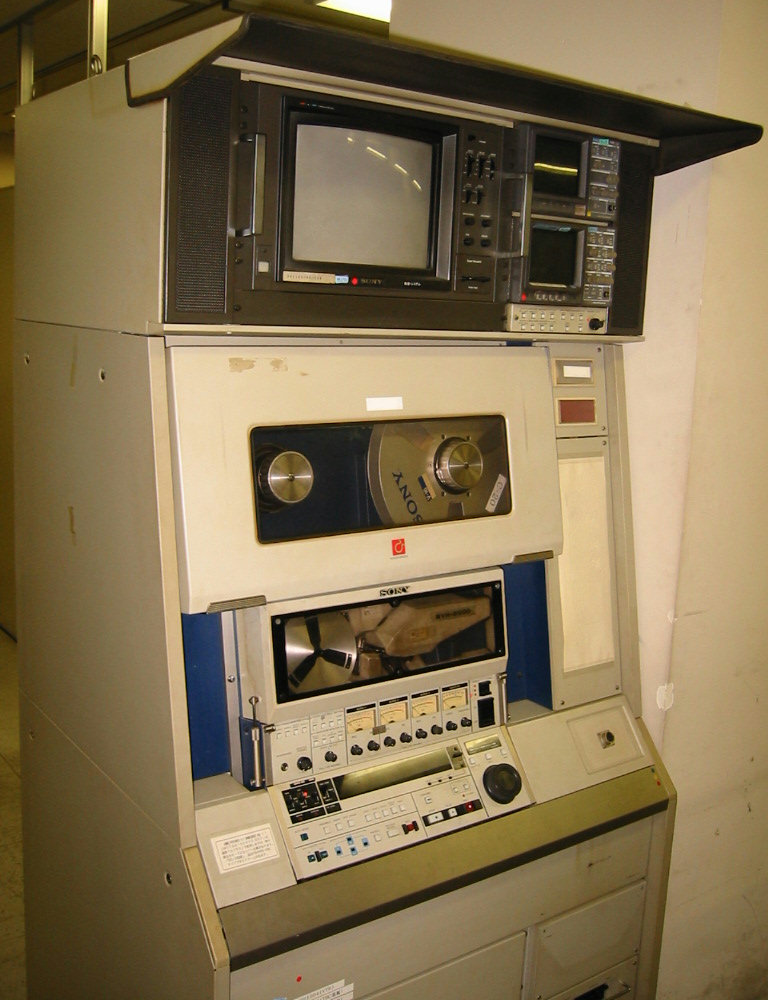
- Sony BVH-2000 1-inch VTR
- Media type: Magnetic tape
- Encoding: NTSC, PAL
- Read mechanism: Helical scan
- Write mechanism: Helical scan
- Developed by: Ampex and Sony
- Usage: Television production
- Released: 1976

1-inch Type C Helical Scan or SMPTE C is a professional reel-to-reel analog recording helical scan videotape format co-developed by Ampex and Sony in 1976. The format uses 1-inch-wide (25 mm) tape and became the replacement in the professional video and broadcast television industries for the then-incumbent 2-inch-wide (51 mm) quadruplex videotape open-reel format. Additionally, it replaced the unsuccessful type A format, also developed by Ampex, and primarily in mainland Europe, it supplemented the type B format, developed by the Fernseh division of Bosch.

== Technical detail ==
Compared to Quad, Type C had a smaller size, comparative ease of operation, and slightly higher video quality. 1-inch Type C is capable of "trick-play" functions such as still, shuttle, and variable-speed playback, including slow motion. 2-inch quadruplex videotape machines lacked these capabilities, due to the segmented manner in which it recorded video tracks onto the magnetic tape. 1-inch Type C VTRs required much less maintenance and used less power and space than did 2-inch machines.

1-inch Type C records composite video at a very high video quality that was superior to contemporary color-under formats such as U-matic, and of comparable quality to analog component video formats like Betacam and MII. Both analog component formats were notoriously fussy and trouble-prone, so in practice Type C gave a stable, more reliable picture than the broadcast quality analog cassette-based videotape formats. Because television was broadcast as a composite signal, there was no real downside to Type C in television broadcasting and distribution. It had approximately 300 lines of resolution, and a bandwidth of 5 MHz, with recording being done with the heads moving across the tape at (a writing speed of) 25.6 metres per second (1,008 in/s), for NTSC signals, and 21.39 metres per second (842 in/s) for PAL signals. As for linear tape speeds, type C VTRs could run at 24.4 centimetres per second (9.6 in/s) for NTSC, and 23.98 centimetres per second (9.44 in/s) for PAL.

Type C VTRs can record a single complete video field in a single revolution of the drum, using a single video head, which made the format useful in computer animation and allowed for stills without frame stores or buffers. The tape is almost completely wrapped around the drum of the VTR in what is known as an omega wrap. Because the omega wrap only wraps the tape 346° around the drum, the vertical blanking interval of the video signal is lost, a problem solved by using a "1 1/2 head" system in which a secondary head scans or reads a narrow strip with the vertical blanking interval when the video head is not reading a video track on the tape.

Sometimes in interlaced video a field is called a frame which can lead to confusion. The NTSC and PAL formats recorded by Type C VTRs are interlaced video formats and thus there is a vertical blanking interval after every field of video.

The format is almost immune to dropouts. PAL Type C VTRs may have higher writing speeds to achieve higher bandwidth given PAL's 5–6 MHz bandwidth versus NTSC's 4.2 MHz. In practice, type C VTRs may have a bandwidth of 4.2 MHz for NTSC, and 5 MHz for PAL. Type C VTRs may have flying video erase heads mounted on the drum, allowing for individual frames to be erased. Some Type C VTRs could support reels with enough tape for 126 minutes of playback with NTSC, and 128 minutes with PAL, with 11.75 inches (298 mm) reels.

== Usage ==
1-inch tape gained numerous uses in television production including outside broadcasts where it was used for instant replays and creating programme titles. 1-inch machines were considerably smaller and more reliable than preceding two-inch versions and were seen by operators as a major technological breakthrough. Due to this smaller size, it was possible for OB (Outside Broadcasting) crews to transport and use multiple machines, allowing for much more complex editing to be done on site for use within the programme. The quality and reliability of 1-inch Type C made it a mainstay in television and video production in television studios for almost 20 years, before being supplanted by more reliable digital videocassette formats like Digital Betacam, DVCAM, and DVCPRO. 1-inch Type C was also widely used for the mastering of early LaserDisc titles. It was replaced in that role by the digital D-2 videocassette format in the late 1980s.

== Ampex models ==
Models include:

- VPR-1 1976, studio model
- VPR-2 studio model
- VPR-20 1977, Portable
- VPR-2A studio model
- VPR-2B studio model
- VPR-80 studio model
- VPR-6 studio model
- SMC-60 slow Motion system
- VPR-3 studio model, with air system like AVR-1
- XVR-80 wideband VTR
- VPR-5 portable made in jointly with Nagra
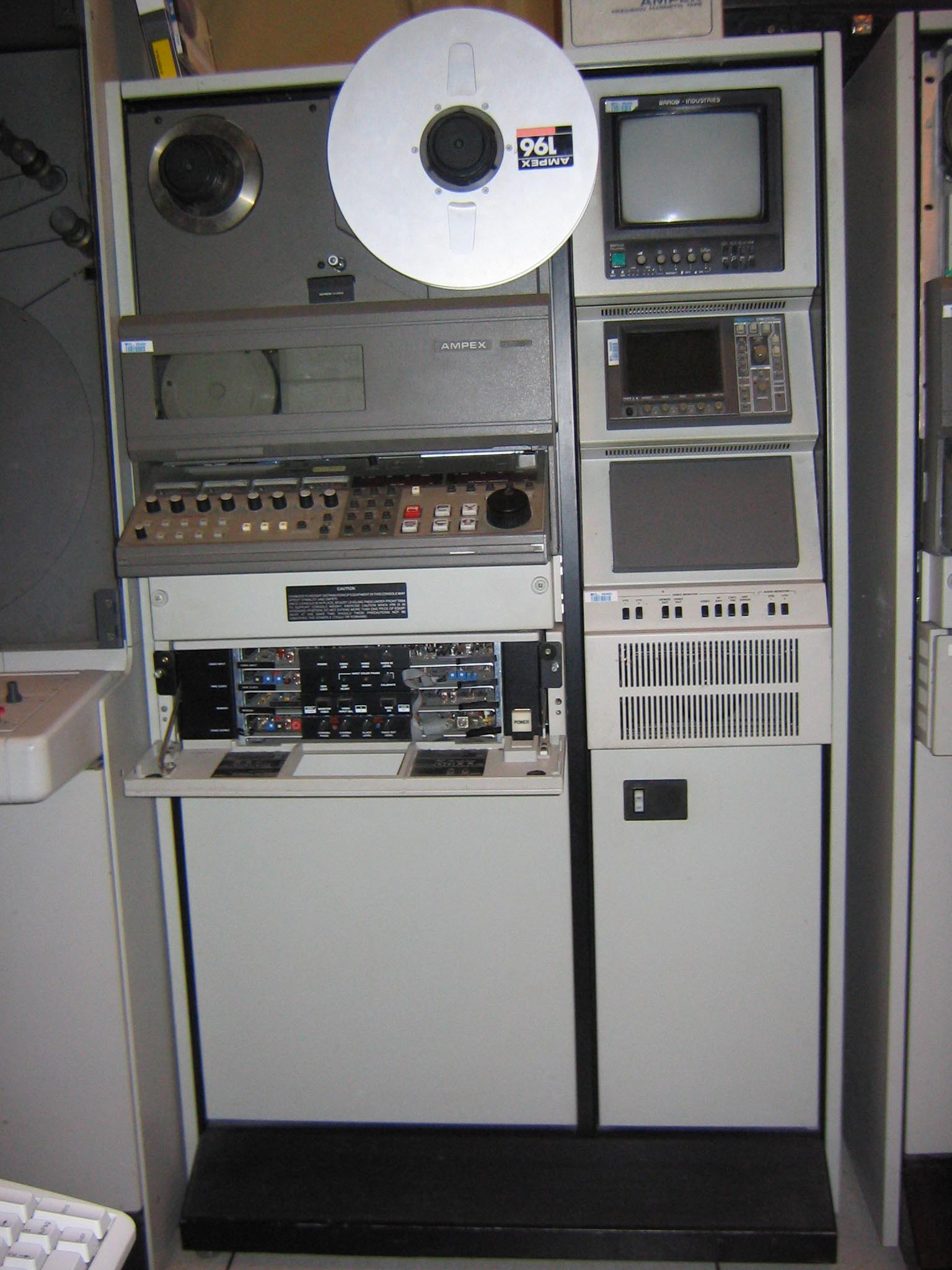
Ampex VPR6 VTR

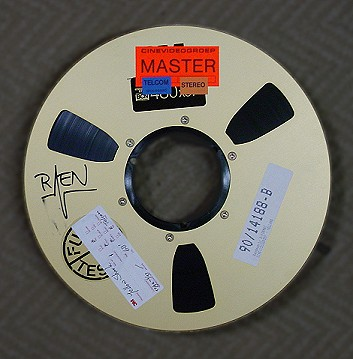
1 inch reel to reel tape

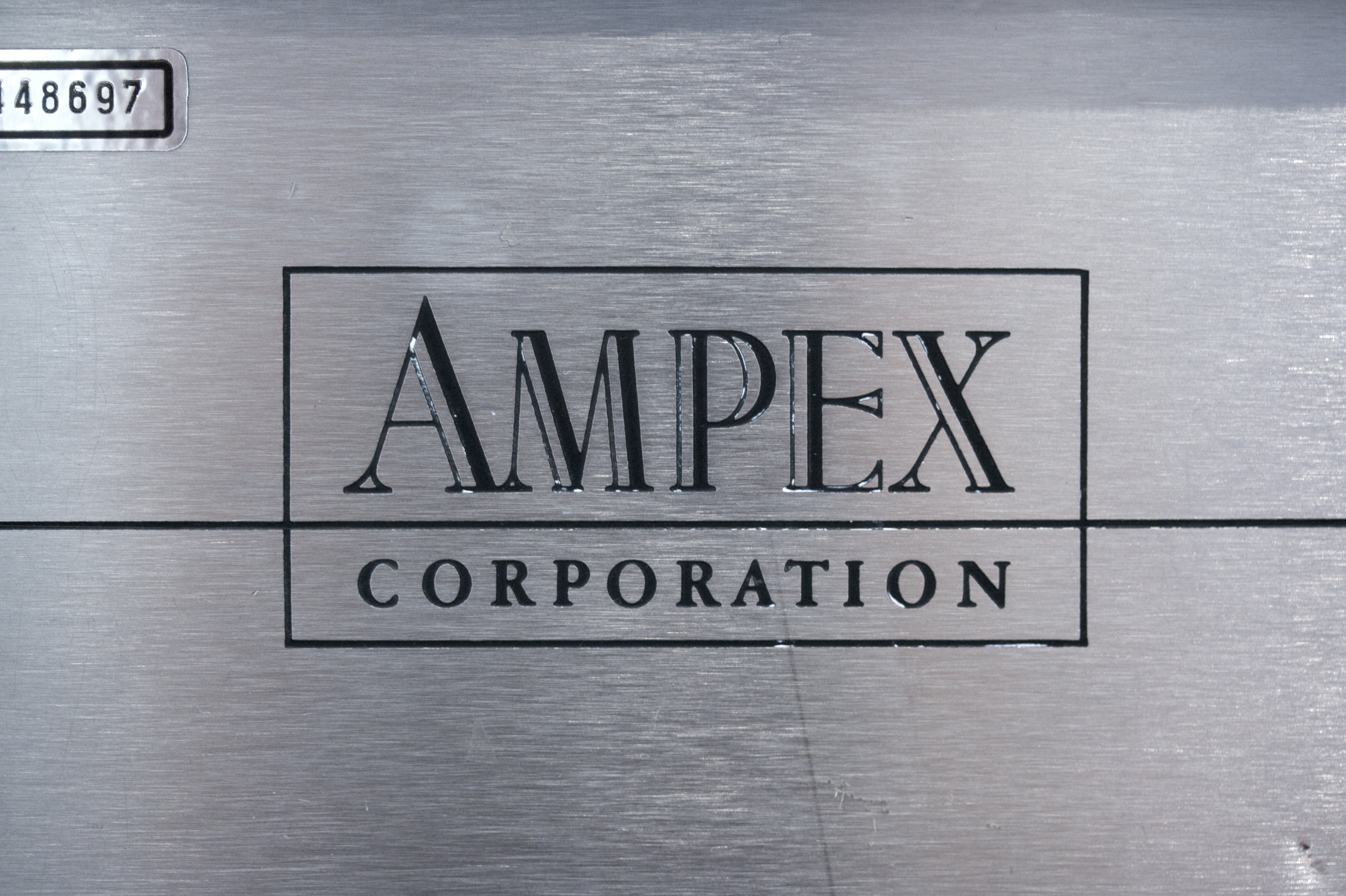
Ampex logo

== Marconi models ==
Models include:

- MR2 studio model

== Sony models ==
Models include:

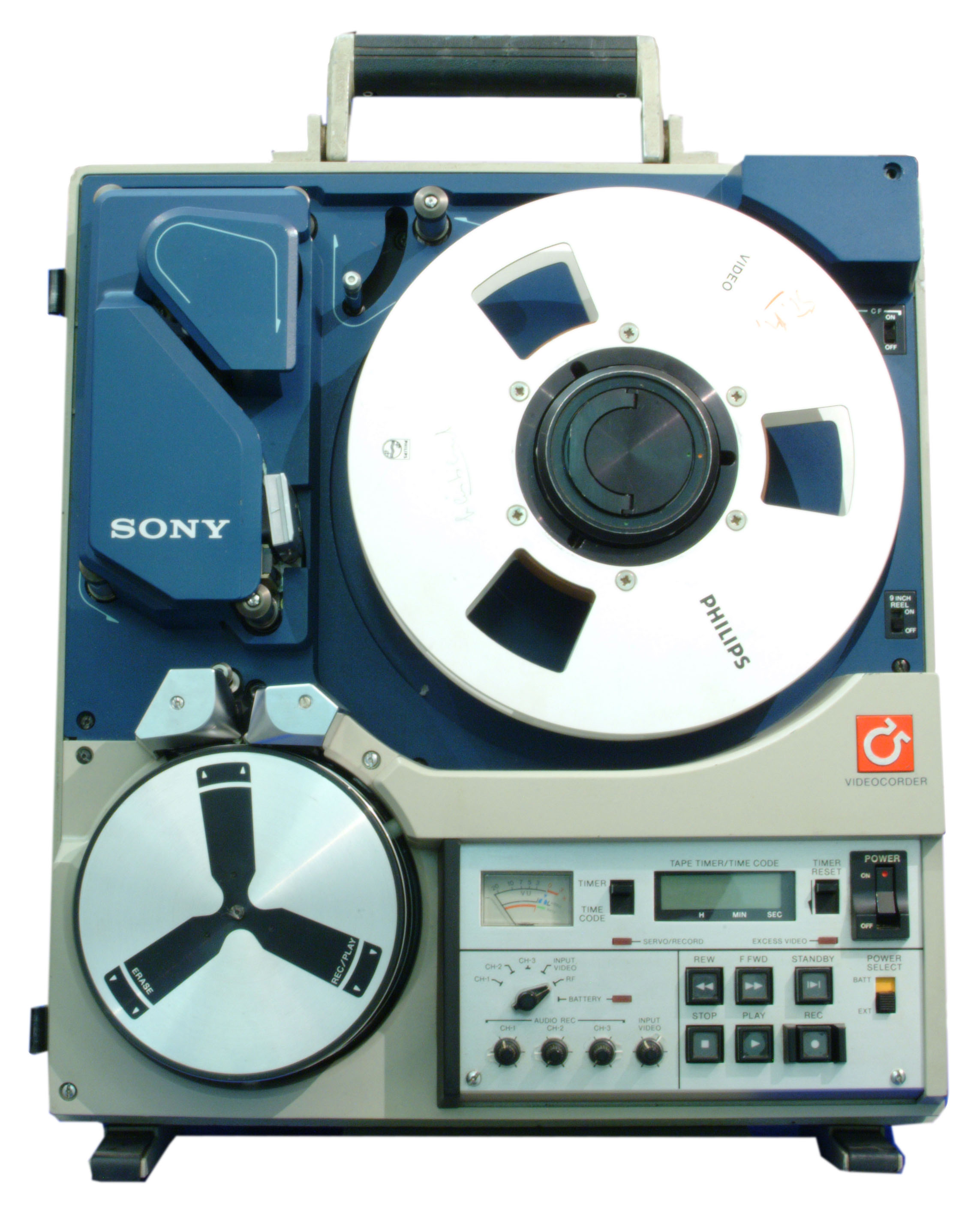
Sony BVH-500 portable VTR with a flying erase head, used to erase video fields (or in this case frames,) individually, for visually clean cuts in editing

- BVH-1000 1976 studio model
- BVH-1100 with Dynamic head Tracking- DT, with digital TBC Model BVT-2000
- BVH-1180 with Dynamic head Tracking- DT, with digital TBC Model BVT-2000
- BVH-500 portable
- BVH-2000 studio model
- BVH-2180 3-hour record / play capability
- BVH-2500 Delta Time VTR
- BVH-2800/2 VTR With PCM Audio
- BVH-2830 VTR with PCM Audio and 3-hour record / play capability
- BVH-3000 Studio model
- BVH-3100 Studio model without sync channel record / play capability

== Hitachi, Ltd. – Shibaden models ==
Models include:

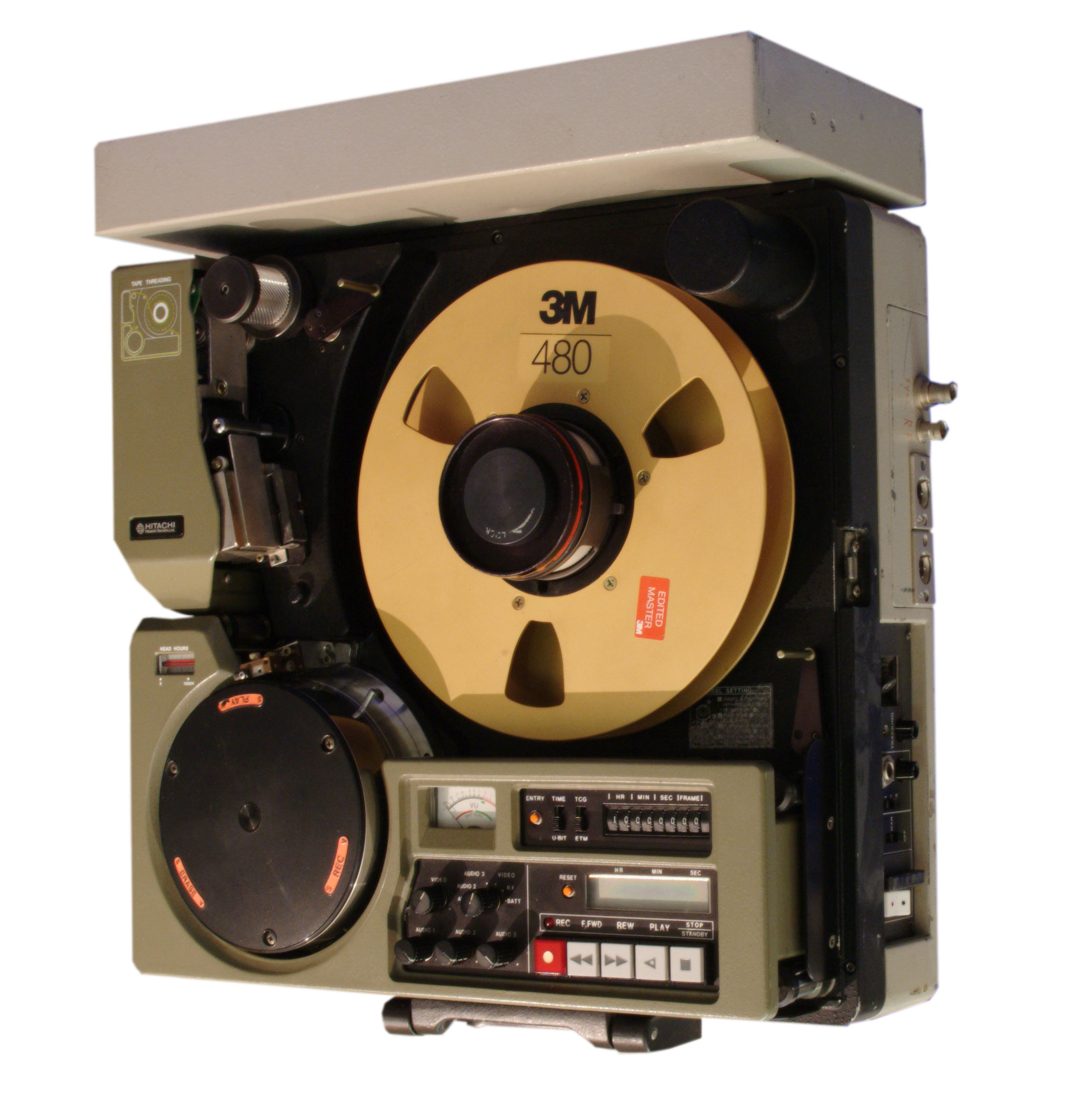
1976 Hitachi portable VTR, for Sony 1" type C

- HR-200 Studio model
- HR-230 2 and 3 hour Record/Play Studio model
- HR-100 portable model, 42 pounds (19 kg)

== NEC models ==
Models include:

- TT-7000 Studio VTR ($38,000 new in 1987)

== RCA models ==
Models include:

- TH-100 was a re-badged Sony BVH-1000.
- TH-200A was a re-badged Sony BVH-1100A.
- TH-50 was re-badged Sony BVH-500 portable.
- TR-800 was an RCA engineered and built VTR, likely why it has the "TR-" designation, as all the RCA Quad recorders did. While the TR-800 was developed by RCA, the scanner assembly and upper drum could be replaced with Sony BVH-1100A parts.

In 1983, RCA turned to Ampex for supply of Helical VTRs.

- TH-400 was a re-badged Ampex VPR-80
- TH-900 was a re-badged Ampex VPR-3
- TH-700 was a re-badged Ampex VPR-6

== 3M models ==
Models include:

- TT-7000 (built by NEC)

== Kometa models (Soviet Union) ==
Models include:

- Кадр-103СЦ (Kadr-103STs), 1985 studio model with DSP and Цифра-101 (Tsifra-101) digital time base corrector

== See also ==
- Type A videotape
- Type B videotape
- IVC videotape format
- Ampex 2 inch helical VTR
