= Data Storage Technology =

Magnetic tape-based data storage format

Data Storage Technology (DST) is a 19 mm (0.75 in) wide magnetic tape data storage format created by Ampex in 1992. The DST format was also made by Ampex as a digital videotape format, DCT, using the same design of cassette. DST is relatively high capacity and high speed, especially compared to other tape technologies available in the 1990s. There are 3 standard tape cartridges sizes compatible with each generation, "Small", "Medium", and "Large".

== Generations ==
Generation	Original	Double Density	Quad Density
Release date	1992	1996	2000
"Small" Capacity (GB)	25	50	100
"Medium" Capacity (GB)	75	150	300
"Large" Capacity (GB)	165	330	660
Max Speed (MB/s)	15		20
