= Type A videotape =

Broadcast magnetic tape-based videotape format

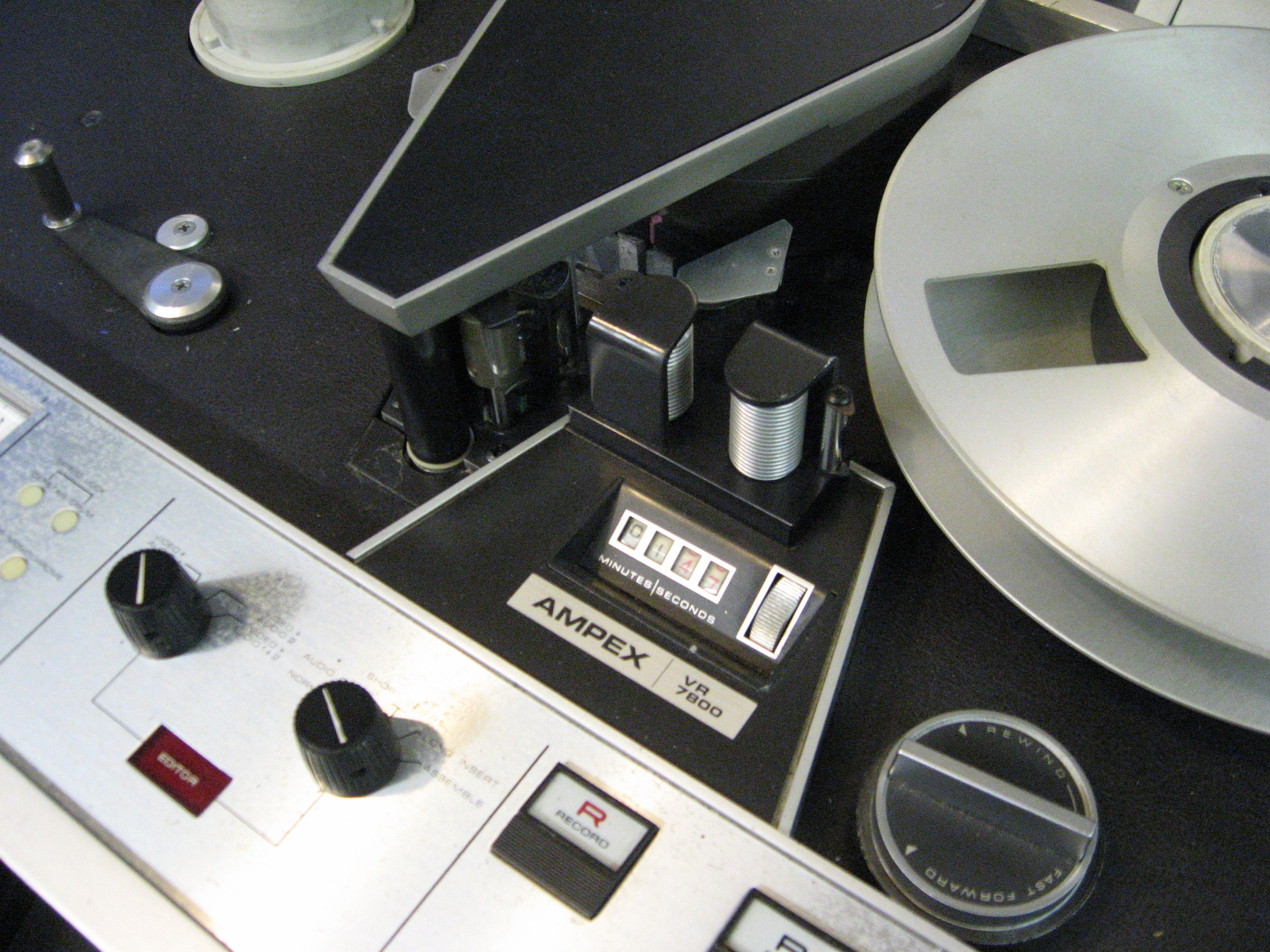
- Media type: Magnetic tape
- Encoding: NTSC, PAL
- Read mechanism: Helical scan
- Write mechanism: Helical scan
- Developed by: Ampex
- Usage: Video production
- Released: 1965

1-inch Type A Helical Scan or SMPTE A is a reel-to-reel helical scan analog recording videotape format developed by Ampex in 1965 that was one of the first standardized reel-to-reel magnetic tape formats in the 1-inch (25 mm) width; most others of that size at that time were proprietary. It is capable of 350 line display resolution.

== Usage ==
Type A was developed as mainly an industrial and institutional format, where it saw the most success. It was not widely used for broadcast television, since it did not meet Federal Communications Commission (FCC) specifications for broadcast videotape formats; the only format passing the FCC's muster at the time was the then-industry-standard 2-inch quadruplex.

The Type A format received broad use by the White House Communications Agency from 1966 to 1969. The WHCA, under U.S. President Lyndon B. Johnson, used the format to videotape television broadcasts off the air or from direct White House feeds. The WHCA recorded programs and events including television appearances by President Johnson, special news broadcasts and news interview programs. Beginning on April 1, 1968, the WHCA taping system was expanded to also include daily morning and evening news programs, both network and local. When U.S. President Richard M. Nixon succeeded Johnson in office in 1969, the WHCA's Type A recording system was continued until it was gradually phased out, later that year, in favor of a recording system using a 2-inch format.

The format was also used by the Vanderbilt Television News Archive at Vanderbilt University in Nashville, Tennessee, upon the archive's founding in 1968. The archive would continue to use the Type A format to make black-and-white recordings of national television newscasts (received off-air, and recorded by the archive, from the local Nashville network-affiliated TV stations that aired them) until 1979, when the archive upgraded to full-color-capable U-matic VCRs for recording.

== Technical details ==
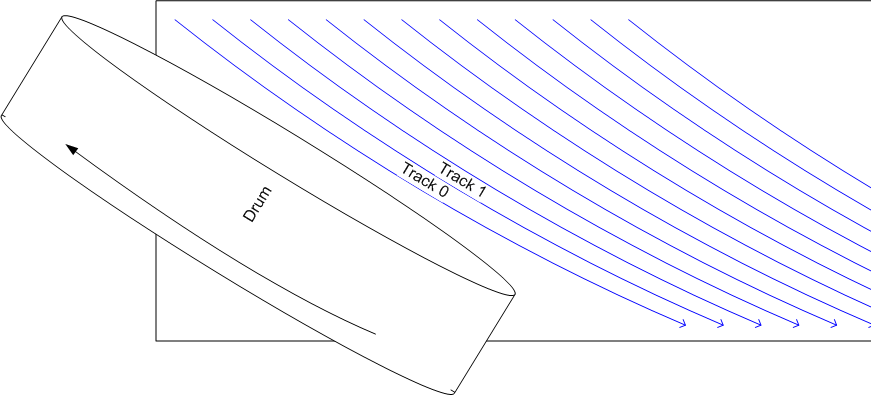
Helical recording method

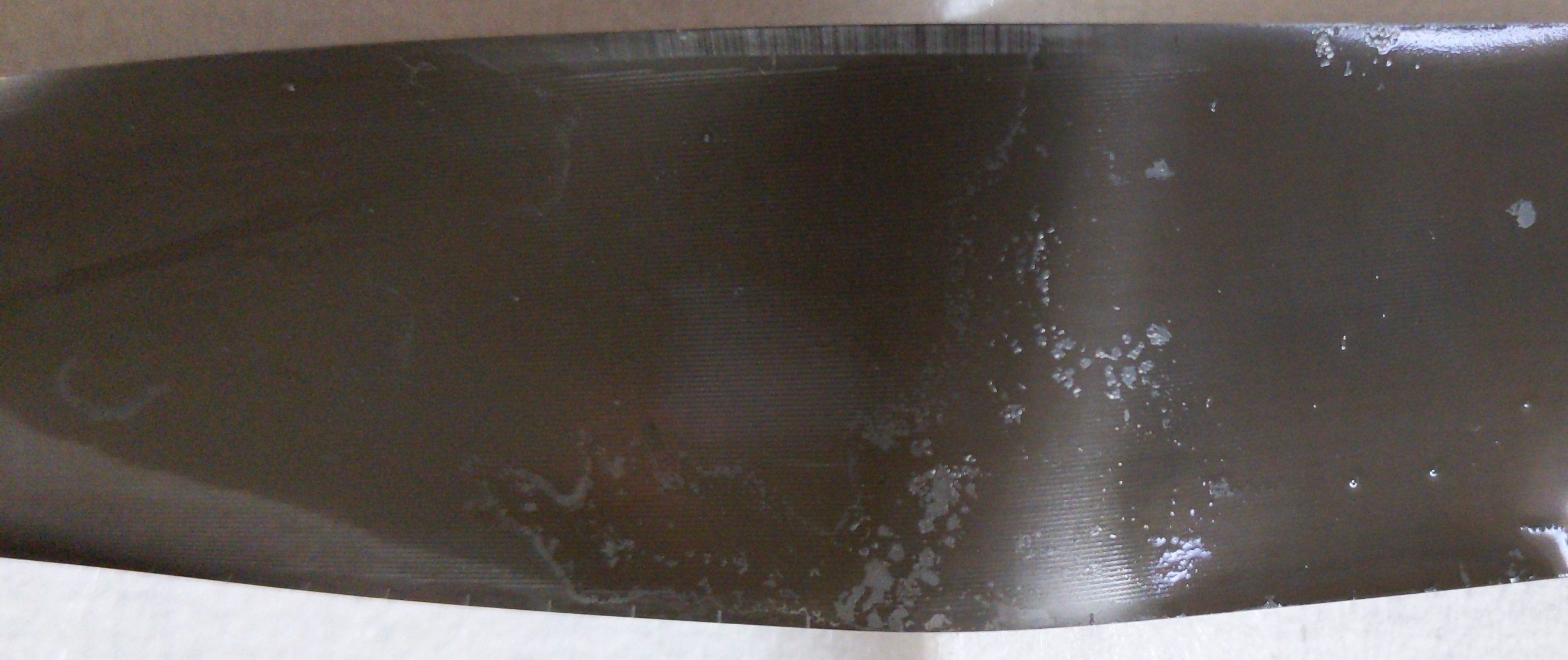
A piece of 1-inch tape under a magnetic developer showing (from top to bottom): mono soundtrack, helical scan video tracks, control pulse track.

Early VTRs were black-and-white (B/W) only, later VTRs supported color television, with a heterodyne playback. Still later units had time base correction playback, like the VPR-1 that could be used at television station and post-production houses.

The VPR-1 had several problems; it did not record the vertical blanking interval (as the format in general was not capable of), which is why it was not compliant with FCC broadcast standards. The video quality was not as good as other broadcast VTRs. Thus Sony and Ampex agreed to make a SMPTE approved type C format VTR (which was based on Type A). Hitachi also later made a C format VTR.

== Some Ampex Type A models ==
- VP-4900 (1965) B/W Player only, no record option.
- VR-5000 (1965) B/W Record-player, very popular, many made.
- VR-5100 (1965) B/W 3 MHz with horizontal resolution of 300 lines, noise ratio of 42 dB.
- VR-5200 VR-5100 (1965) B/W with TV tuner.
- VPR-5200 VR-5200 with professional connectors
- VR-5800 Low and high band. Very popular, many made.
- VPR-5800 VR-5800 with professional connectors
- XVR-5800 Medical certified 1 Type A VTR.
- VR-5803 PAL VR-5800 TVR
- VR-6000 Low band VTR, With stop motion mode added. Wood case.
- VR-6003 PAL VR-6000
- VR-6050 Low band VTR, very basic, low cost.
- VR-6275 (1966) Wood cabinet with a two TV Tuners (one watch one to record), load speakers.
- VR-6300 (1966) VR-6275 without the TV Tuner.
- VR-7000 Microphone input add, playback RF modulator, low and high band and other improvements.
- VR-7100 (1967)With roll around cart, self-contained, with TV tuner, small monitor and B&W camera.
- VR-7300 (1968) Color option with external color stabilizer. Hetrodyne color processor.
- VR-7003 PAL VR-7300.
- VL-7404 A time lapse VTR. Up to 38 hours with 9-3/4" reel of 3000' 1" tape. $5,900
- VR-7450
- VR-7500 Rec/play B&W and color. 4.2 MHz video bandwidth. Very popular, many made.
- XVR-7500 higher record band, better color pictures. Professional connectors
- VR-7503 PAL VR-7500
- VR-7800 Editing added, Color option. 1st with removable electronic cards for servicing. $9,500 in 1968.
- VPR-7800 VR-7800 Professional.
- VR-7803 PAL VR-7800
- VP-4500C A VR-7800 VTR, but a Player only, no record option, heterodyne color processor.
- VR-7900 Is a VPR-7800 with an extra modulation standard added is very high, same quality as quad high band. 1975
- VPR-7900A (TBC option, the TBC-790, 1975)
- VR-7903 PAL VR-7900
- VPR-7950A Console model of the VR7900, with monitoring and a TBC (TBC-790 analog, TBC-800 digital).
- VPR-1 (1976) Studio VTR, Digital TBC with SlowMo and still frame. Some later VPR-1s were converted to Type C format by Ampex. Quickly replaced with C format, VPR-2 in 1976.
- VPR-10 (1976) Portable VPR1, discontinued before delivery, replaced with VPR-20, C format in 1977.

== See also ==
- Video tape recorder (VTR)
- Type B videotape
- Type C videotape
- IVC videotape format
- Ampex 2-inch helical VTR
