= Ampex =

American audio and video recorder and storage media company

Ampex Data Systems Corporation
- Type: Subsidiary
- Industry: Data and instrumentation technology for acquisition, storage, and processing of visual information
- Founded: 1944; 82 years ago
- Founder: Alexander Poniatoff
- Headquarters: Hayward, California, United States
- Products: miniR 700 Mini-Recorder, TuffServ 540 & 640 smart NAS, TuffCORD smart NAS, AMux700 DAU, BLUE IQ deep-learning data management, BLUE Sentry on-board cyber security
- Parent: Delta Information Systems
- Website: ampex.com

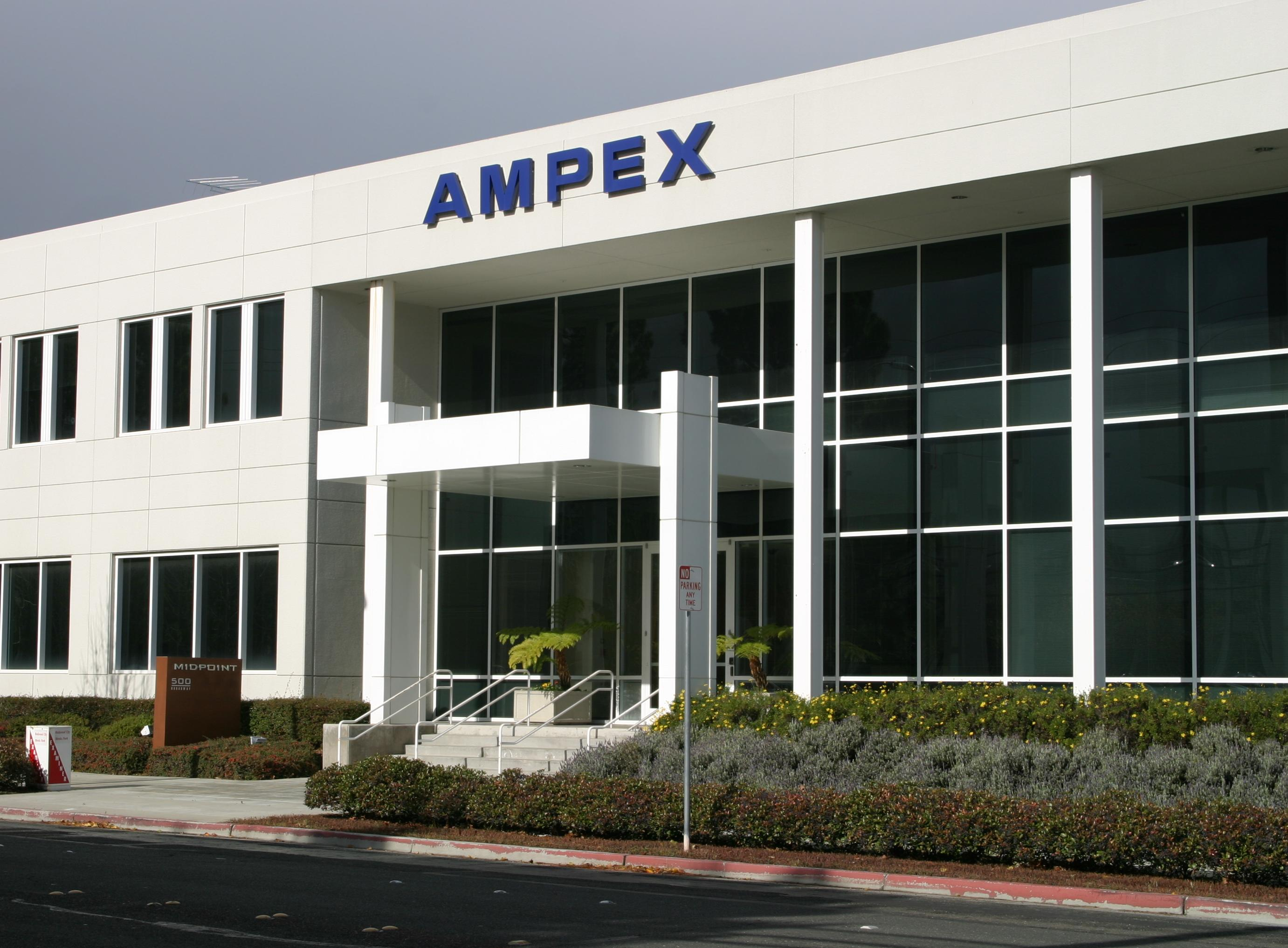
Former Ampex headquarters on Broadway in Redwood City, California

Ampex Data Systems Corporation is an American electronics company founded in 1944 by Alexander M. Poniatoff as a spin-off of Dalmo-Victor. The name AMPEX is an acronym, created by its founder, which stands for Alexander M. Poniatoff Excellence. Ampex operates as Ampex Data Systems Corporation, a subsidiary of Delta Information Systems, and consists of two business units. The Silicon Valley unit, known internally as Ampex Data Systems (ADS), manufactures digital data storage systems capable of functioning in harsh environments. The Colorado Springs, Colorado, unit, referred to as Ampex Intelligent Systems (AIS), serves as a laboratory and hub for the company's line of industrial control systems, cyber security products and services and its artificial intelligence/machine learning technology.

Ampex's first great success was a line of reel-to-reel tape recorders developed from the German wartime Magnetophon system at the behest of Bing Crosby. Ampex quickly became a leader in audio tape technology, developing many of the analog recording formats for both music and movies that remained in use into the 1990s. Starting in the 1950s, the company began developing video tape recorders, and later introduced the helical scan concept that made home video players possible. They also introduced multi-track recording, slow-motion and instant playback television, and a host of other advances. Ampex's tape business was rendered obsolete during the 1990s, and the company turned to digital storage products.

Ampex moved into digital storage for DoD Flight Test Instrumentation (FTI) with the introduction of the first, true all digital flight test recorder. Ampex supports numerous major DoD programs with the US Air Force, US Army, US Marines, US Navy and other government entities (NASA, DHS and national labs). Ampex also works with all major DoD primes and integrators including Boeing, General Atomics, Lockheed, Northrop, Raytheon and many others.

== Origin ==
Russian–American inventor Alexander Matthew Poniatoff established the company in San Carlos, California, in 1944 as the Ampex Electric and Manufacturing Company. The company name came from his initials plus "ex" to avoid using the name AMP already in use (by Aircraft and Marine Products). During World War II, Ampex was a subcontractor to Dalmo-Victor, manufacturing high quality electric motors and generators for radars that used alnico 5 magnets from General Electric. Ampex was initially set up in an abandoned loft-space above the Dalmo-Victor plant; eventually they would have offices at 1313 Laurel Street, San Carlos, California (at the intersection of Howard Avenue and Laurel Street).

Near the end of the war, while serving in the U.S. Army Signal Corps, Major Jack Mullin was assigned to investigate German radio and electronics experiments. He discovered the Magnetophons with AC biasing on a trip to Radio Frankfurt. The device produced much better fidelity than shellac records. The technological processes in tape recording and equipment developed by German companies before and during the 1939–1945 war were subject to patents which were effectively voided after Germany's 1945 surrender and defeat. Mullin acquired two Magnetophon recorders and 50 reels of BASF Type L tape, and brought them to America, where he produced modified versions. He demonstrated them to the Institute of Radio Engineers in San Francisco on May 16, 1946.

Bing Crosby, a big star on radio at the time, was receptive to the idea of pre-recording his radio programs. He disliked the regimentation of live broadcasts, and much preferred the relaxed atmosphere of the recording studio. He had already asked the NBC network to let him pre-record his 1944–45 series on transcription discs, but the network refused; so Crosby had withdrawn from live radio for a year and returned (this time to the recently created ABC) for the 1946–47 season, only reluctantly.

In June 1947, Mullin, who was pitching the technology to the major Hollywood movie studios, got the chance to demonstrate his modified tape recorders to Crosby. When Crosby heard a demonstration of Mullin's tape recorders, he immediately saw the potential of the new technology and commissioned Mullin to prepare a test recording of his radio show. Ampex was finishing its prototype of the Model 200 tape recorder, and Mullin used the first two models as soon as they were built. After a successful test broadcast, ABC agreed to allow Crosby to pre-record his shows on tape. Crosby immediately appointed Mullin as his chief engineer and placed an order for $50,000 worth of the new recorders so that Ampex (then a small six-man concern) could develop a commercial production model from the prototypes.

Crosby Enterprises was Ampex's West Coast representative until 1957.

== Early tape recorders ==
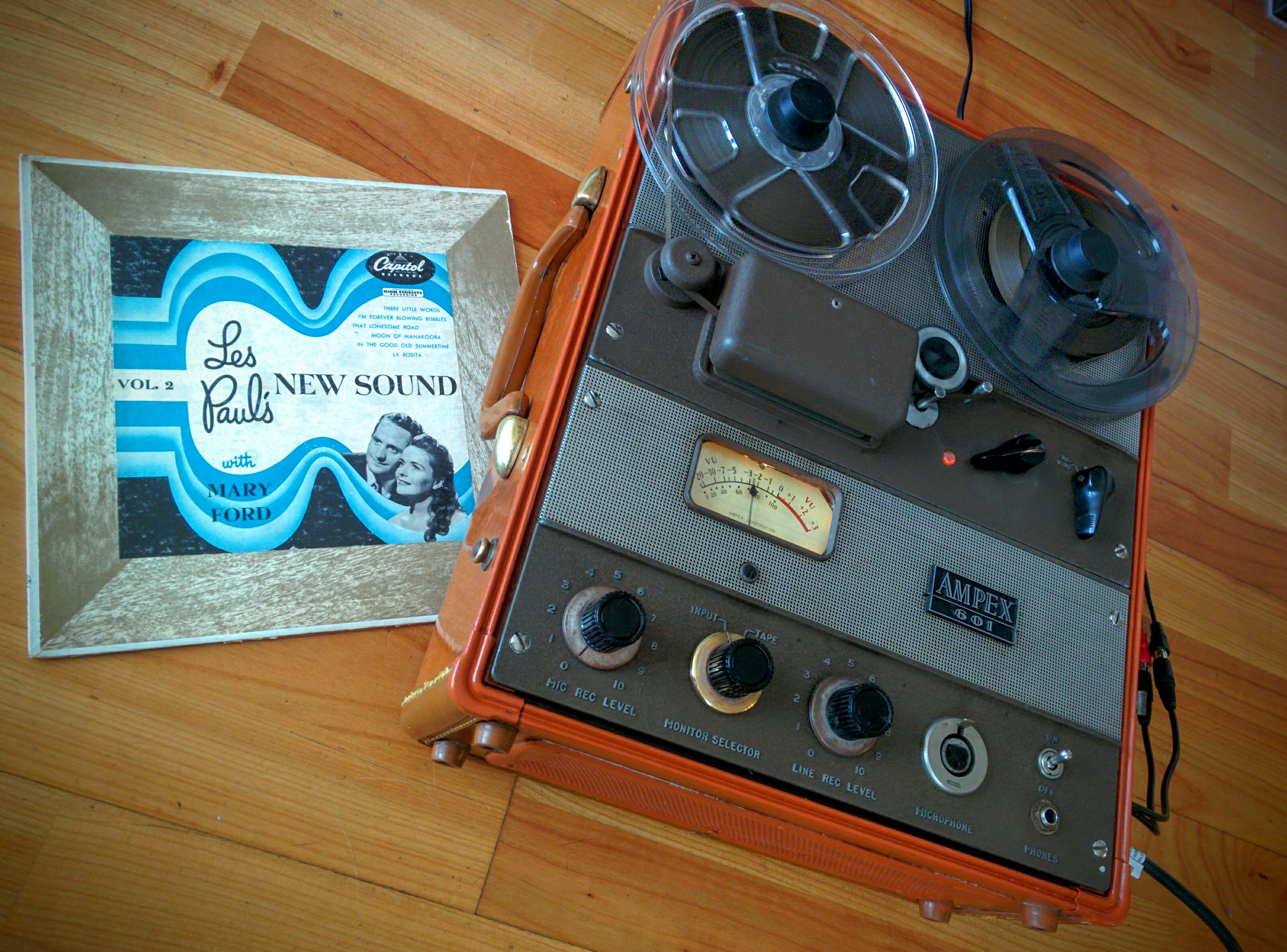
Ampex 601 playing a recording of "Les Paul's New Sound, Vol. II". Made in Redwood City, California, c. 1956.

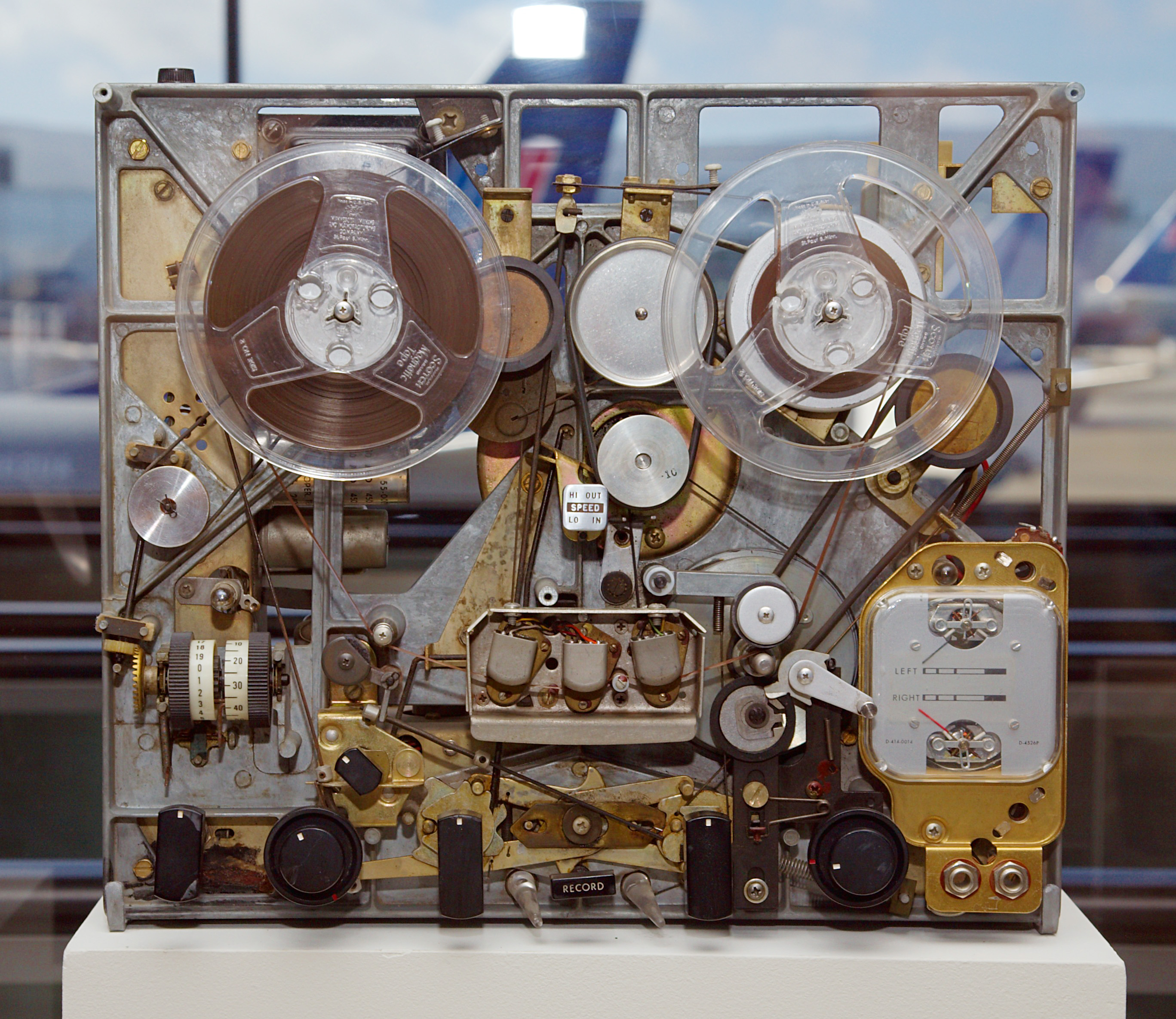
Internals of Ampex Fine Line F-44, a 3-head Ampex home-use audio tape recorder, c. 1965

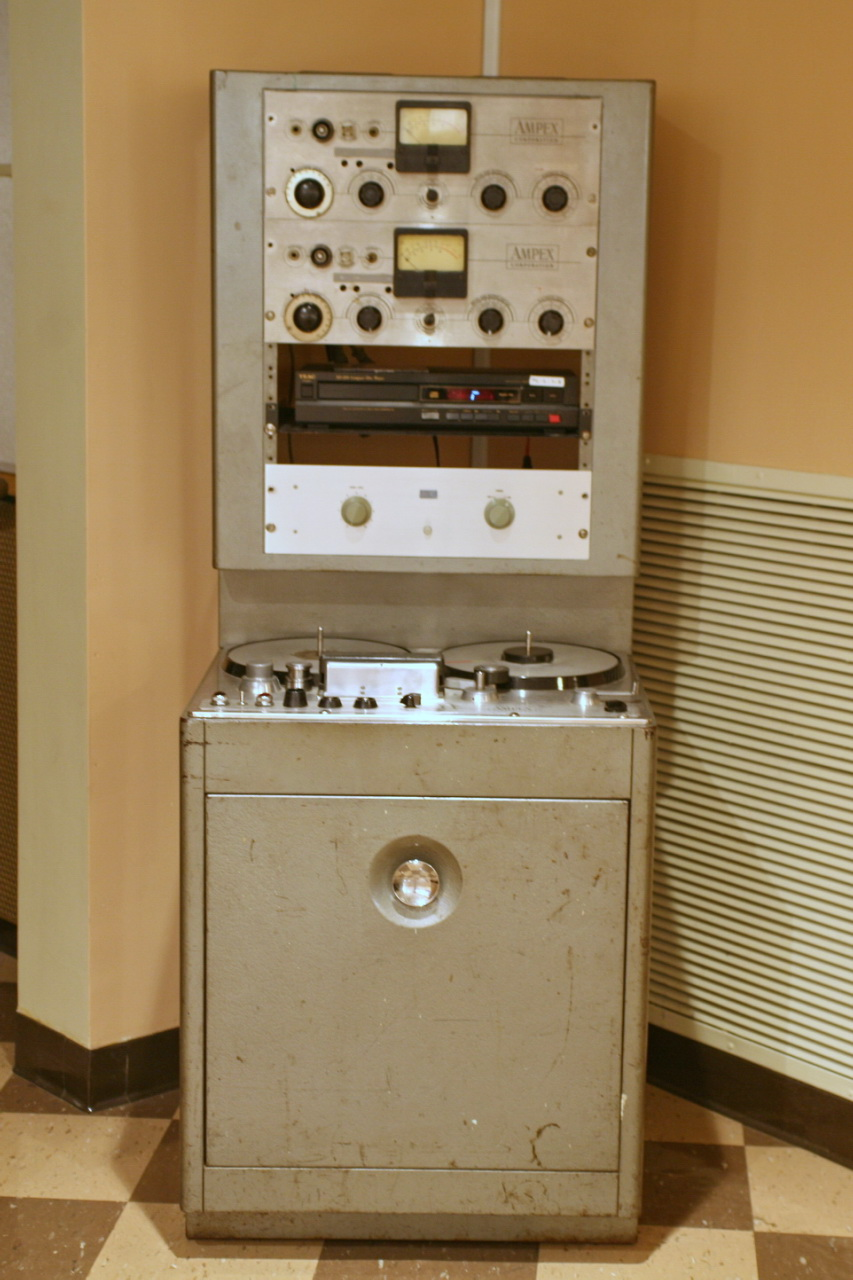
AMPEX model 300 half-inch three-track recorder

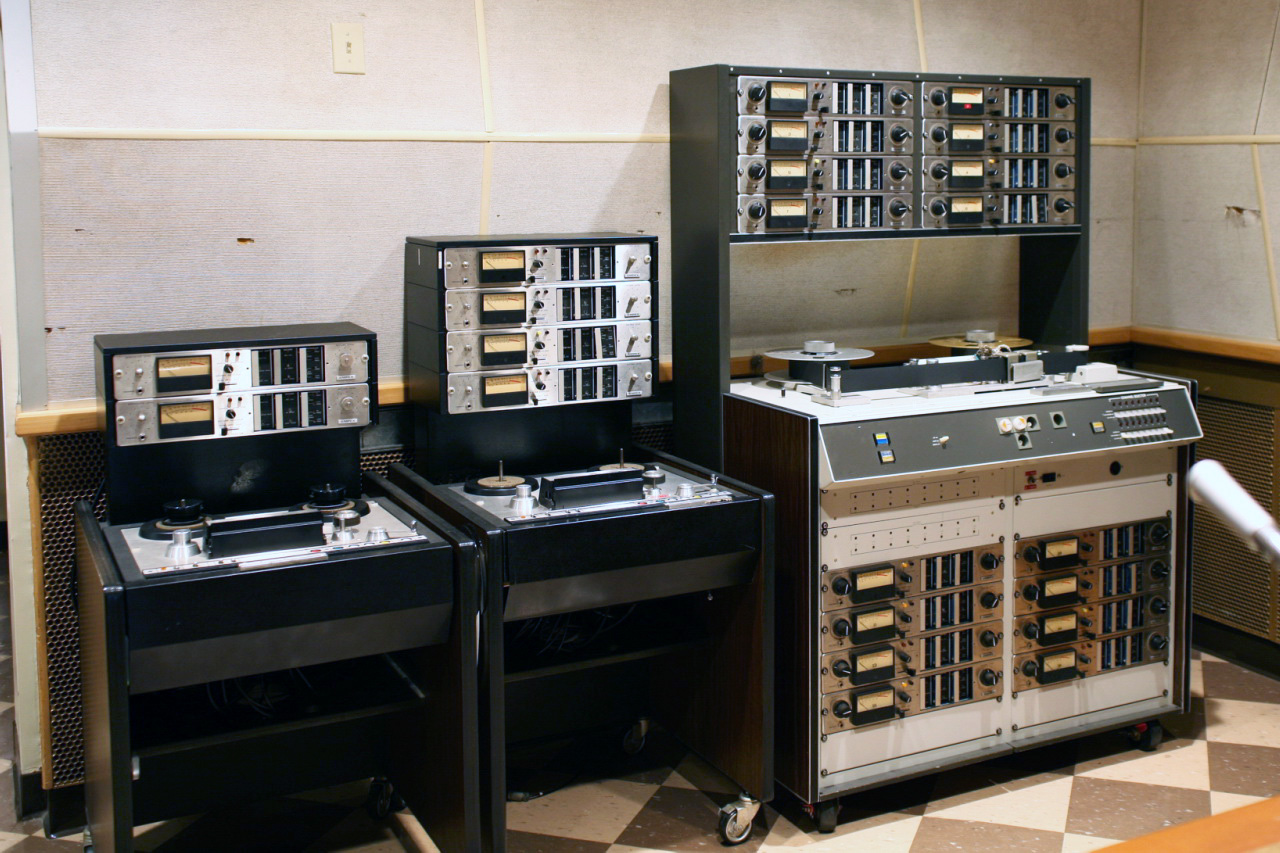
AMPEX 440 (2tr, 4tr) & 16-track MM 1000

The company's first tape recorder, the Ampex Model 200A, was first shipped in April 1948. The first two units, serial numbers 1 and 2, were used to record Bing Crosby's show. The American Broadcasting Company used these recorders along with 3M Scotch 111 gamma ferric oxide coated acetate tape for the first-ever U.S. delayed radio broadcast of Bing Crosby's Philco Radio Time. Ampex tape recorders revolutionized the radio and recording industries because of their superior audio quality and ease of operation over audio disk cutting lathes.

The firm's earliest production of multichannel machines was not aimed at music recording; it noted in 1953–54 that "Ampex began the commercial production of multitrack tape recorders about four years ago for those interested in telemetered information from guided missiles and the like. These equipments provided any number of simultaneous channels up to 14. It was a simple step, therefore, to make stereophonic tape recorders with two or more channels."

During the early 1950s, Ampex began marketing one- and two-track machines using 1/4-inch (6.4 mm) tape. In May 1953 the firm announced production of two- and three-track machines on 1/4 inch tape. The line soon expanded into three- and four-track models using 1/2-inch (13 mm) tape. In the early 1950s, Ampex moved to Redwood City, California. Ampex acquired Orradio Industries in 1959, which became the Ampex Magnetic Tape Division, headquartered in Opelika, Alabama. This made Ampex a manufacturer of both recorders and tape. By the end of that decade Ampex products were much in demand by top recording studios worldwide.

In 1952, movie producer Mike Todd asked Ampex to develop a high-fidelity movie sound system using sound magnetically recorded on the film itself, as contrasted with the technology of the time, which used magnetic tracks on a separate celluloid base film (later commonly known as mag stock). The result of this development was the CinemaScope/Todd-AO motion picture sound system, which was first used in movies such as The Robe (1953) in 35mm and Oklahoma (1955) in 70mm (and also in 35mm). In 1960, the Academy of Motion Picture Arts and Sciences awarded Ampex an Oscar for technical achievement as a result of this development.

Les Paul, a friend of Crosby and a regular guest on his shows, had already been experimenting with overdubbed recordings on disc. He received an early portable Ampex Model 300 from Crosby. Using this machine, Les Paul invented "Sound on Sound" recording technology. He placed an additional playback head, located before the conventional erase/record/playback heads. This allowed Paul to play along with a previously recorded track, both of which were mixed together on to a new track. This was a destructive process because the original recording was recorded over.

For Operation Gold in Berlin 1955–56, 150 Ampex tape recorders in the warehouse operations centre were used to record intercepted Soviet telephone calls and teletype messages.

== Professional 8-track recorders ==
Ampex built a handful of multitrack machines during the late 1950s that could record as many as eight tracks on 1-inch (25 mm) tape. The project was overseen by Ross Snyder, Ampex manager of special products. To make the multitrack recorder work, Snyder invented the Sel-Sync process, which used some tracks on the head for playback and other tracks on the head for recording. This made the newly recorded material be in sync with the existing recorded tracks. The first of these machines cost $10,000 and was installed in Les Paul's home recording studio by David Sarser.

In 1967, Ampex responded to demand by stepping up production of their 8-track machines with the production model MM 1000. Like earlier 8-track machines of this era, it used 1-inch tape.

== 16 and 24-track recorders ==
In 1966, Ampex built their first 16-track recorder, the model AG-1000, at the request of Mirasound Studios in New York City. In 1967, Ampex introduced a 16-track version of the MM 1000 which was the world's first 16-track professional tape recorder put into mass-production. Both used a 2-inch (51 mm) tape transport design adapted from the video recording division. The 16-track MM-1000 quickly became legendary for its tremendous flexibility, reliability and outstanding sound quality. This brought about the "golden age" of large format analog multitrack recorders which would last into the mid-1990s. MCI built the first 24-track recorder (using 2-inch tape) in 1968 which was installed at TTG Studios in Los Angeles. Later machines built by Ampex starting in 1969 would have as many as 24 tracks on 2-inch tape. In addition to this, the introduction of SMPTE time code allowed studios to run multiple machines in perfect synchronization, making the number of available tracks virtually unlimited.

By the 1970s, Ampex faced tough competition from the Swiss company Studer and Japanese manufacturers such as Otari and Sony (who also purchased the MCI brand in 1982). In 1979, Ampex introduced their most advanced 24-track recorder, the model ATR-124. The ATR-124 was ruggedly constructed and had audio specifications that nearly rivaled the first digital recording machines. However, sales of the ATR-124 were slow due to the machine's high price tag. Ampex sold only about 50 or 60 ATR-124 machines and withdrew from the professional audio tape recorder market entirely in 1983.

== The 1990s ==
By the 1990s Ampex focused more on video recorders, instrumentation recorders, and data recorders. In 1991, Ampex sold their professional audio recorder line to Sprague Magnetics. The Ampex Recording Media Corporation spun off in 1995 as Quantegy Inc.; that company has ceased producing recording tape.

Consumer models

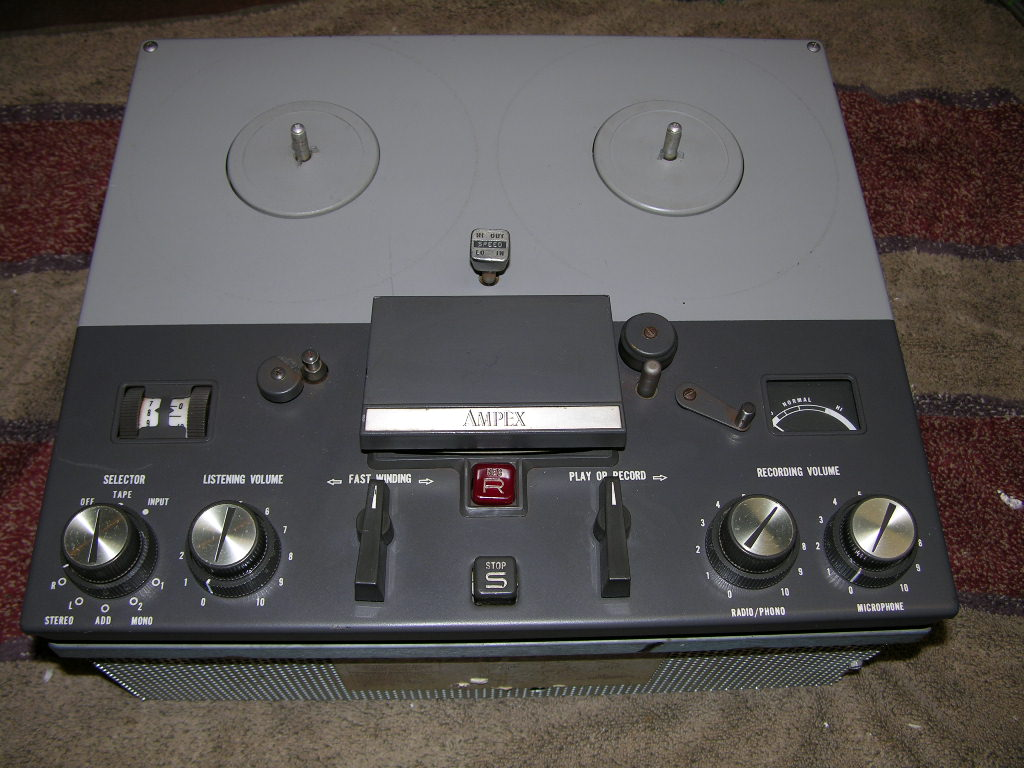
Ampex Model 1250 tube stereo tape recorder c. 1962 – designed for the high end consumer market

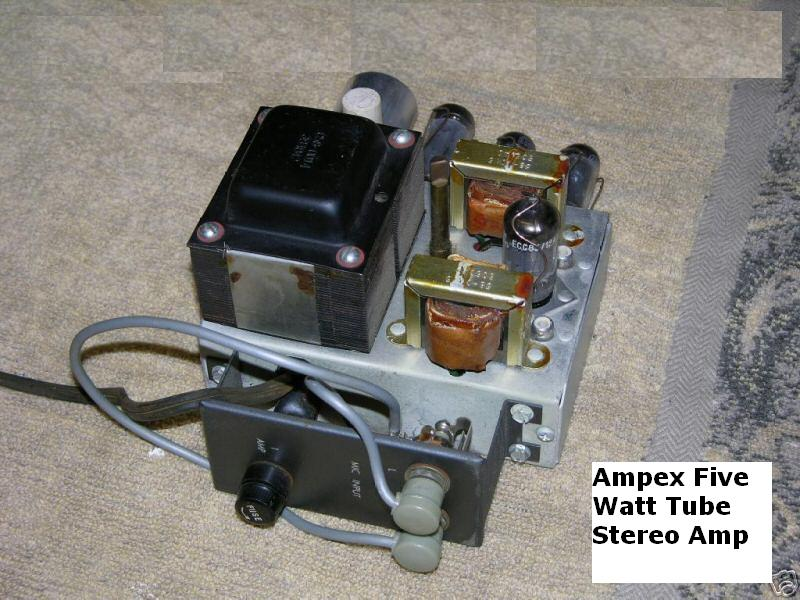
The 5 watt Ampex tube stereo amplifier from a Model 970

== Video technology ==
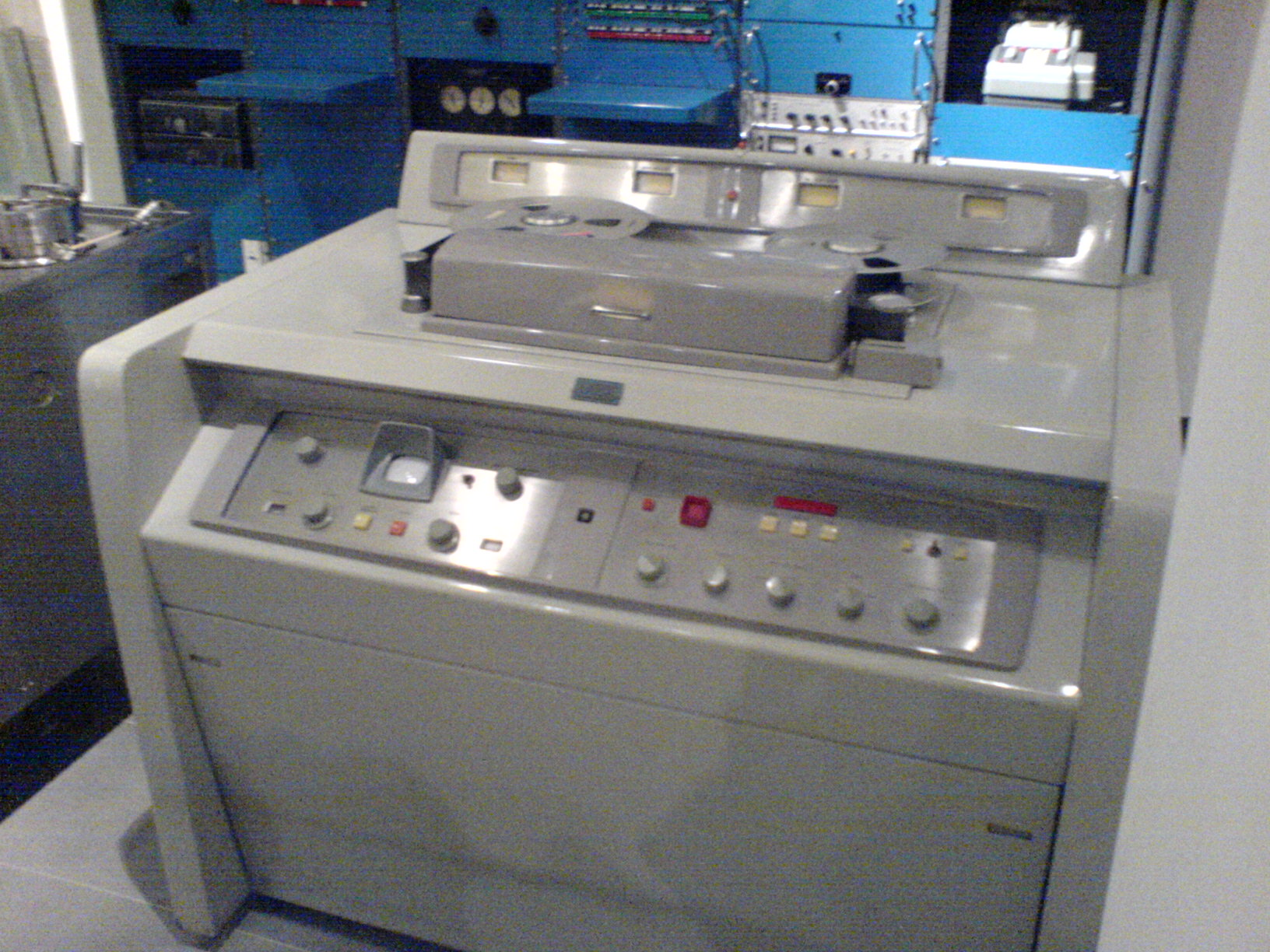
AMPEX VR-1000A (1950s)

=== Video processing ===
While AMPEX are well recognized for their contribution to magnetic tape recording, they also had a huge impact on developments the whole video signal chain. They did rebadge some specialist low-volume OEM products to complete the package, but their in-house teams developed industry leading products in the following categories:

=== Digital optics ===
ADO – Ampex Digital Optics provided comprehensive frame manipulation in 2 and 3 dimensions. Adjusting the aspect, size, and rotation of the image was performed continuously in real-time. An optional digital 'combiner' was available to perform the foreground layering and priority switching – to reduce the burden on the vision mixer with multi-channel effects.

=== Video switching and effects ===
AVC – The AVC range of vision mixers ranged from small, single buss devices up to the high-end Century Series, with multiple Mix/Effect busses, infinite re-entry and powerful keying and control software.

=== Editing controllers ===
The product line evolved quickly from manual editing on the actual VTRs themselves to incorporate SMPTE timecode providing advanced timeline control. The RA-4000 and EDM-1 were fully functional early products, but soon evolved to the extremely powerful ACE family to compete with CMX and other edit controller brands.

=== Quadruplex two-inch tape ===
Starting in the early 1950s, RCA, Bing Crosby and others tried to record analog video on very fast-moving magnetic tape. As early as 1952, Ampex developed prototype video tape recorders that used a spinning head and relatively slow-moving tape. In early 1956, a team produced the first videotape recorder. A young, 19-year-old engineer Ray Dolby was also part of the team. Ampex demonstrated the VR-1000, which was the first of Ampex's line of 2-inch Quadruplex videotape recorders on April 14, 1956, at the National Association of Radio and Television Broadcasters in Chicago. The first magnetically recorded time-delayed television network program using the new Ampex Quadruplex recording system was CBS's Douglas Edwards and the News on November 30, 1956.

The "Quad" head assembly rotates at 14,400 rpm (NTSC). The four head pieces (quad) are switched successively so that recorded stripes cross the video portion (most of the tape middle, audio is on one edge, control track is on the other) so that head to tape write speed is well in excess of the 15-inch-per-second (38 cm/s) physical motion. They wrote the video vertically across the width of a tape that was 2 inches (51 mm) wide and ran at 15 inches (38 cm) per second. This allowed hour-long television programs to be recorded on one reel of tape. In 1956, one reel of tape cost $300; and Ampex advertised the cost of the recorder as $45,000. A 7.5-inch-per-second (19 cm/s) version was released later, and this required a new, narrower headwheel. This vertical writing facilitated mechanical editing, once the control track was developed to display the pulse that indicates where a frame ends and the next one begins. Later, Ampex developed electronic editing.

The National Academy of Television Arts and Sciences awarded Ampex its first Emmy in 1957 for this development. Ampex received a total of 12 Emmys for its technical video achievements.

In 1959, Richard Nixon, then Vice President, and Nikita Khrushchev held discussions at the Moscow Trade Fair, which became known as the "Kitchen Debate" because they were mostly held in the kitchen of a suburban model house. These discussions were recorded on an Ampex color videotape recorder, and during the debate Nixon pointed this out as one of the many American technological advances.

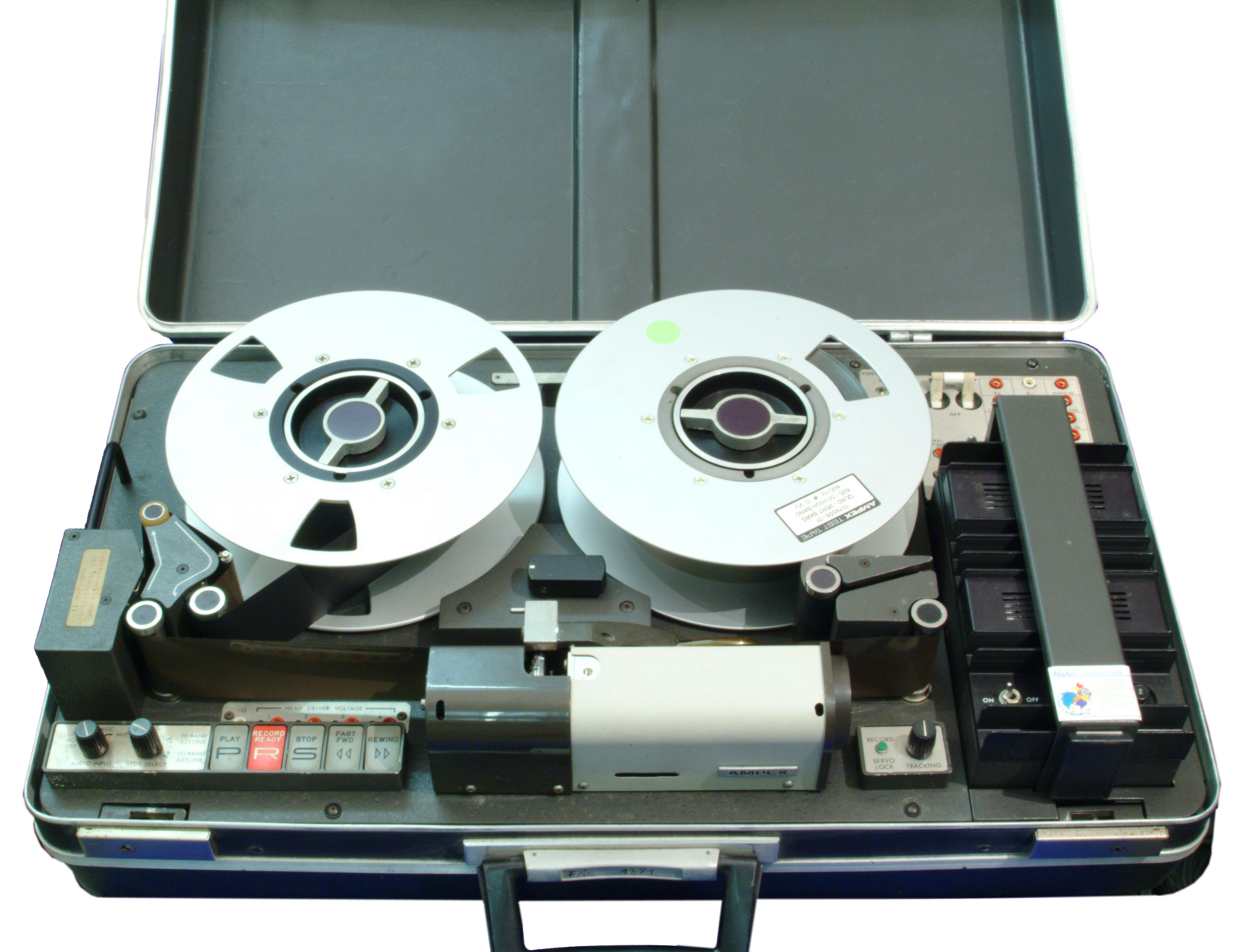
AMPEX VR-3000 (1967)

In 1967, Ampex introduced the Ampex VR-3000 portable broadcast video recorder, which revolutionized the recording of broadcast quality television in the field without the need for long cables and large support vehicles. Broadcast quality images could now be shot anywhere, including from airplanes, helicopters and boats.

The Quadruplex format dominated the broadcast industry for a quarter of a century. The format was licensed to RCA for use in their "television tape recorders." Ampex's invention revolutionized the television production industry by eliminating the kinescope process of time-shifting television programs, which required the use of motion picture film. For archival purposes, the kinescope method continued to be used for some years; film was still preferred by archivists. The Ampex broadcast video tape recorder facilitated time-zone broadcast delay so that networks could air programming at the same hour in various time zones. Ampex had trademarked the name "video tape", so competitor RCA called the medium "TV tape" or "television tape". The terms eventually became genericized, and "videotape" is commonly used today.

While the quadruplex recording system per se is no longer in use, the principle evolved into the helical scanning technique used in virtually all video tape machines, such as those using the consumer formats of VHS, Sony Betamax and Video 2000. Sony Betacam was successful as a professional format but operated with a different recording system and faster tape speed than Betamax.

One of the key engineers in the development of the Quadruplex video recorder for Ampex was Ray Dolby, who worked under Charlie Ginsburg and went on to form Dolby Laboratories, a pioneer in audio noise reduction systems. Dolby's contribution to the videotape system was limited to the mathematics behind the reactance tube FM modulator, as videotape then used FM modulation for the video portion. Another contributor designed the FM modulator itself. Dolby left Ampex to seek a PhD in physics in England, which is where Dolby Labs was later founded, before moving back to San Francisco. Dolby's brother Dale was also an engineer at Ampex.

=== VR-5000 and VR-8000 ===
In 1961, Ampex introduced the first 1-inch helical scan video recorders, the Ampex 2-inch helical VTRs, which recorded video using helical scan recording technology on tape.

=== Ampex 2-inch helical VTR ===
Ampex 2 inch helical VTRs were manufactured from 1963 to 1970. Model VR-1500 for home. The VR-660 for Broadcast television systems, industrial companies, educational institutions, and a few for In-flight entertainment. The VR-1500 and VR-660 found service at educational institutions especially due to their relatively low cost vs. 2-inch (51 mm) quadruplex VTRs. These machines were simple to operate, reliable, small in size—and produced, for their time, very good video without the complexity of the larger and much more complex 2" Quad machines.

=== HS-100 and HS-200 "slo-mo" disc recorder ===
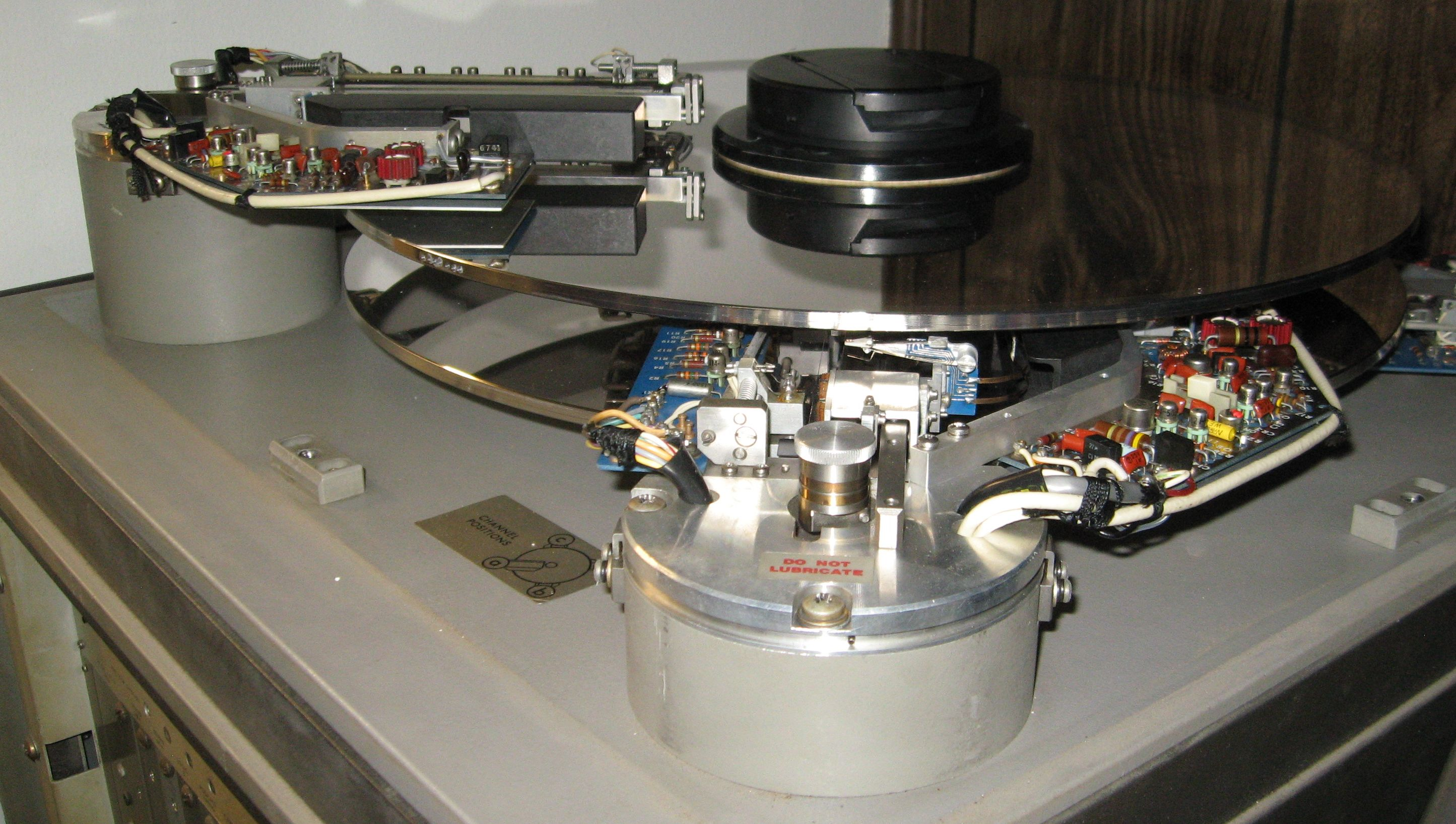
HS-100 disc

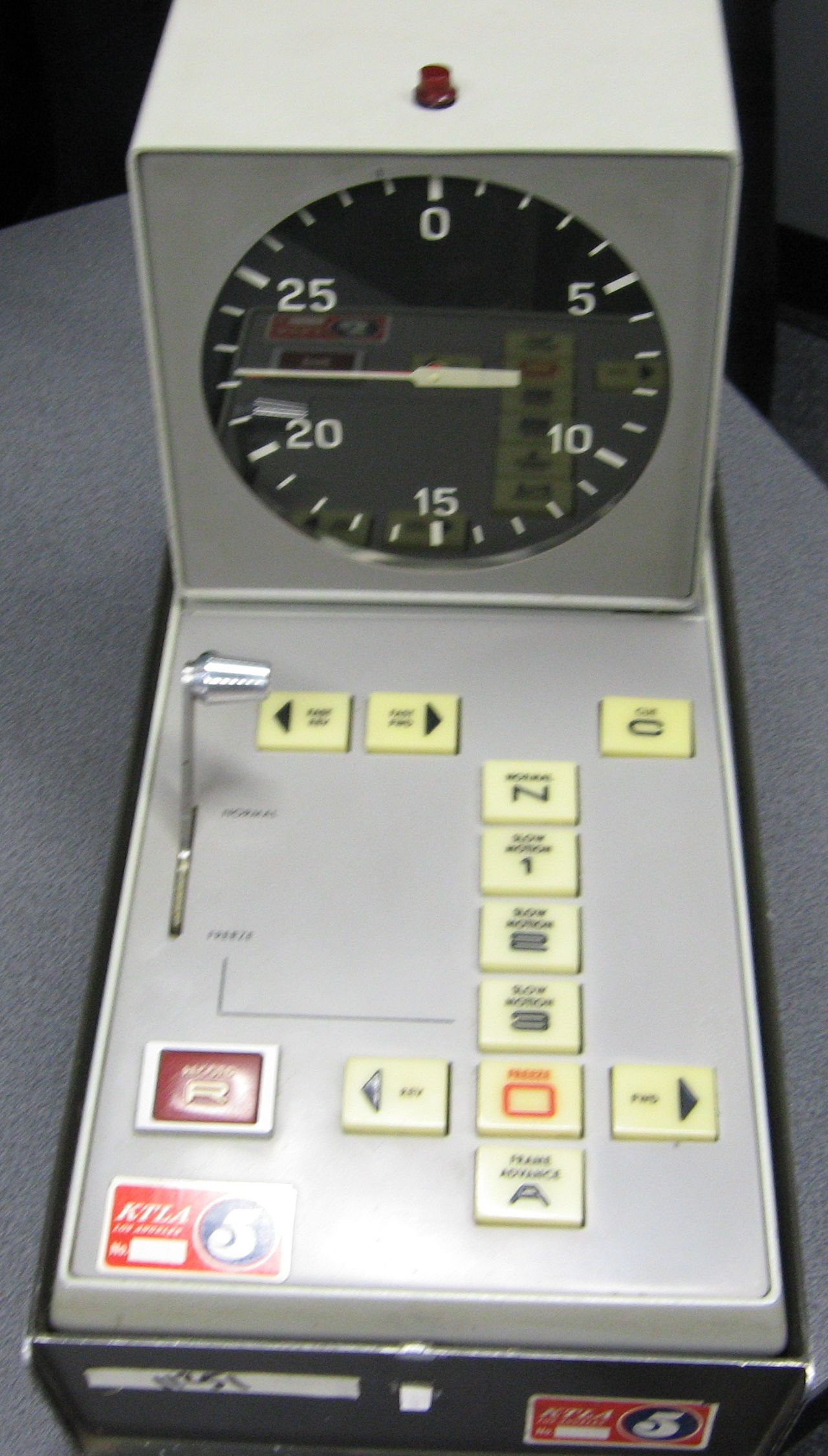
HS-100 Controller

In March 1967, Ampex introduced the HS-100 video disc recorder. The system was developed by Ampex at the request of the American Broadcasting Company (ABC) for a variety of sports broadcast uses. It was first demonstrated on the air on March 18, 1967, when ABC's Wide World of Sports televised the "World Series of Skiing" from Vail, Colorado. The video was recorded on analog magnetic disc. The disc weighed 5 pounds (2.3 kg) and rotated at 60 rps, 3600 rpm (50 rps in PAL). One NTSC unit could record 30 seconds of video, PAL units 36 seconds. The video could then be played back in slow motion, stop action to freeze frame.

A more deluxe version, the HS-200, was introduced in April 1968, and provided a large control console with variable speed playback. This made it ideal for instant replay for sports events and precise timing control in post-production service. CBS-TV was the first to use the technique during live sportscasts, though it was quickly adopted by all American TV networks. The HS-200, which was an HS-100 connected to a control console, had greater precise frame and timing control capability, lending itself to post-production applications like special effects and titles. The HS-200 had a frame accurate timing computer that enabled frame-accurate cuts and dissolve transitions by way of a two-input video switcher. Slow-motion sequences could likewise be programmed and could be "triggered" to begin via an external control pulse such as might come from an external VTR editor like the Ampex VR-2000 VTR with Editec. The HS-200 was the first system capable of single-frame video animation recording, using magnetic discs as opposed to videotape. The HS-200 also provided a readout with specific frame numbers showing from the 900 frames available (NTSC version). Sequences could be triggered to start from any of these 900 frames with frame-accurate repeatability for creative fine tuning of sequence start and end points.

=== Type A ===
1 inch type A videotape (designated Type A by the Society of Motion Picture and Television Engineers, SMPTE) was an open-reel helical scan videotape format developed by Ampex in 1965, one of the first standardized open-reel videotape formats in the 1 inch (25 mm) width; most others of that size at that time were proprietary.

=== Type C ===
1 inch type C videotape (designated Type C by SMPTE) was a professional open-reel videotape format co-developed and introduced by Ampex and Sony in 1976. It became the replacement in the professional video and television broadcast industries for the then-incumbent Quadruplex.

=== D2 ===
D2 is a digital video tape format created by Ampex and other manufacturers (through a standards group of SMPTE) and introduced at the 1988 NAB (National Association of Broadcasters) convention as a lower-cost alternative to the D-1 format. Like D-1, D-2 video is uncompressed; however, it saves bandwidth and other costs by sampling a fully encoded NTSC or PAL composite video signal, and storing it directly to magnetic tape, rather than sampling component video. This is known as digital composite.

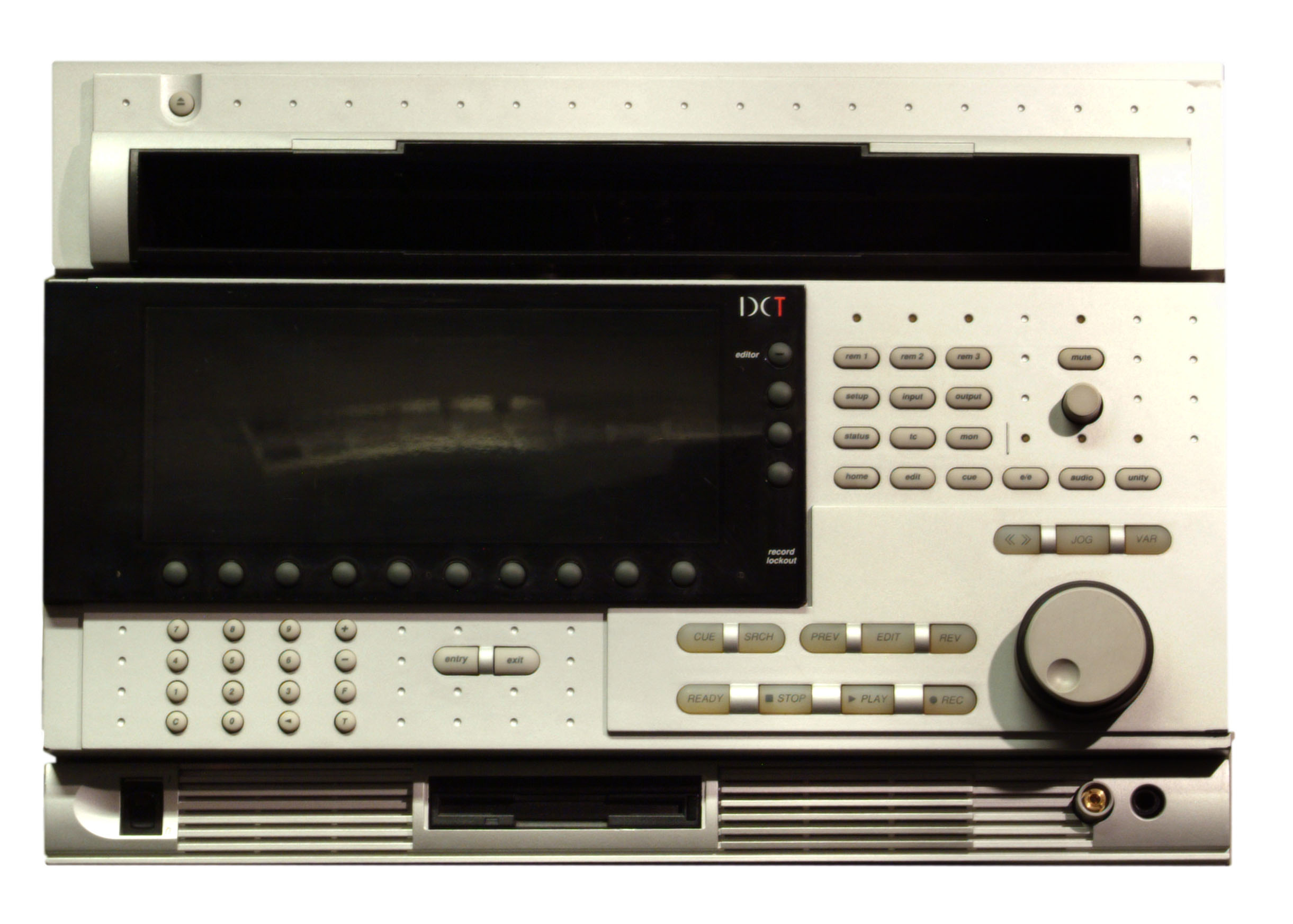
AMPEX DCT-1700D (1992)

=== DCT and DST ===
Digital Component Technology (DCT) and Data Storage Technology (DST) are VTR and data storage devices respectively, created by Ampex in 1992. Both were similar to the D1 and D2 VTR formats, using a 19-millimetre (3/4 in) width, with the DCT format using DCT (discrete cosine transform) video compression, also its namesake.

The DCT and DST formats yielded relatively high capacity and speed for data and video. Double-density DST data storage was introduced in 1996. The final generation of these products were quad density, introduced in 2000, resulting in a large cartridge holding 660GB of data.

== Milestones ==
- In 1948, the first tape-delayed U.S. radio program was broadcast by using an Ampex Model 200 tape recorder.
- In May 1949 Model 300 introduced improvements in audio head, tape drive and tape path.
- In 1950, Model 400 introduced lower cost professional quality audio recorder, soon to be replaced by the Model 400A, which was the logical precursor of the Model 350.
- In 1950, Ampex introduced the first "dedicated" instrumentation recorder, Model 500, built for the U.S. Navy.
- In April 1953 Model 350 introduced audio recorder to replace the Model 400/Model 400A. The Model 350 had more simplicity and durability. Ampex released the 35 mm four-track CinemaScope stereo reproduction system.
- In May 1954 Model 600 introduced mastering quality audio portable recorder. Models 3200-3300 high-speed duplicators also introduced.
- In 1954, in a recording studio equipped with an Ampex reel-to-reel audio tape recording machine, an unknown truck driver named Elvis Presley recorded his historic first single, "That's All Right" at Sun Studios in Memphis. Also that year, Ampex introduced the first multi-track audio recorder derived from multi-track data recording technology.
- In 1955, Ampex released the 70 mm and 35 mm six-track and four-track Todd-AO system, and an improved 35mm four-track system.
- On March 14, 1956, The Ampex VRX-1000 (later renamed the Mark IV) videotape recorder is introduced at the National Association of Radio and Television Broadcasters in Chicago. This is the first practical videotape recorder and is hailed as a major technological breakthrough. CBS goes on air with the first videotape delayed broadcast, Douglas Edwards and The News, on November 30, 1956, from Los Angeles, California, using the Ampex Mark IV.
- In March 1957, Ampex won an Emmy award for the invention of the Video Tape Recorder (VTR).
- In 1958, NASA selected Ampex data recorders and magnetic tape. It has been used for virtually all U.S. space missions since.
- In 1959, the Nixon-Khrushchev Kitchen Debate was recorded on Ampex videotape. The fact that the debate was being videotaped was mentioned by Nixon as an example of American technological development.
- In 1960, The Academy of Motion Picture Arts and Sciences presented Ampex with an Oscar for technical achievement.
- January 1961 Helical scan recording was invented by Ampex. The technology behind the worldwide consumer video revolution, it is used in all home video tape recorders.
- In 1963, Ampex technology was used to show replays of the live assassination of Lee Harvey Oswald.
- In 1963, Ampex introduced EDITEC, electronic video editing, allowing broadcast television editors frame-by-frame recording control, simplifying tape editing and the ability to make animation effects possible. This was the basis for all subsequent editing systems.
- On December 7, 1963 – Instant Replay is used for the first time during the live transmission of the Army Navy Game by its inventor, director, Tony Verna.
- In April 1964, Ampex introduced the VR-2000 high band videotape recorder, the first ever to be capable of color fidelity required for high quality color broadcasting.
- February 1965 – introduced VR-303 and VR-7000 closed-circuit video tape recorder.
- May 1965 – introduced AG-350 first all-transistorized audio recorder.
- July 1965 – introduced VR-660B VTR advanced version of VR-660; replaces VR-660 and VR-1500.
- November 1965 – introduced VR-7000 compact portable closed circuit video tape recorder.
- During 1966–1967, Ampex FR-900 data drives were used to record the first images of the Earth from the Moon, as part of the Lunar Orbiter program. Two drives were refurbished to recover the images as part of the Lunar Orbiter Image Recovery Project (LOIRP).

The first image of Earth taken from the Moon. On the left the original and on the right a digitally restored version created by LOIRP.	Ampex FR-900 at LOIRP

- In 1967, ABC used the Ampex HS-100 disk recorder for slow-motion playback of downhill skiing on the program World Series of Skiing in Vail, Colorado. This was the first use of slow-motion instant replay in sporting events.
- In 1968, the introduction of the Ampex VR-3000 revolutionizes video recording: the first truly portable VTR. It is used at the '68 Summer Olympics in Mexico City to follow the world's cross-country runners for the first time in Broadcast history.
- In 1969, Ampex introduced Videofile, still in use at Scotland Yard for the electronic storage and retrieval of fingerprints.
- In 1972, Ampex introduced the ACR-25, the first automated robotic library system for the recording and playback of television commercials. Each commercial was recorded on an individual cartridge. These cartridges were then loaded into a large rotating carousel. Using sophisticated mechanics and vacuum pneumatics, the "carts" were loaded into and extracted from the machine with an 8-second cycle time for spots under 61 seconds. This freed TV stations from loading individual machines with spots in real time, or preparing spot reels in advance of a broadcast. The TV newsroom also began to use the ACR-25 to run news stories because of its random-access capability. The ACR-25 used AVR-1 signal, servo, and timebase systems, and a machine-programming control bay designed by Ampex engineer E. Stanley Busby. Both machines had a lockup time of 200 milliseconds, as distinct from the industry standard 5 second pre-roll. This was accomplished with optical-vacuum reel servos providing the vacuum capstan negligible inertial mass to control, and predictive digital servos that could re-frame vertically at horizontal rate, as well as timebase correction with a window exceeding 64 microseconds (compared to the VR-2000's window of less than 5 microseconds).
- Also in 1970, Ampex started its own record label, Ampex Records. Its biggest hit was "We Gotta Get You A Woman" by Todd Rundgren (as "Runt"), reaching No. 20 on the charts in 1970.
- In 1978, the Ampex Video Art (AVA) video graphics system is used by artist LeRoy Neiman on air during Super Bowl XII. AVA, the first video paint system, allows the graphic artist, using an electronic pen, to illustrate in a new medium, video. This innovation paved the way for high quality electronic graphics, such as those used in video games.
- In 1982, Ampex introduced DST (high-performance computer mass storage products able to store half the Library of Congress in 21 square feet (2.0 m^{2}) of floor space) and DCT, the first digital component postproduction system using image compression technology to produce high quality images.
- In 1983, Ampex introduced the DCRS digital cassette recorder, offering compact cassette storage with the equivalent of 16 digital or 8 DDR instrumentation reels on one cassette. Also, Partial Response Maximum Likelihood (PRML) data decoding technology has its first use in Ampex's DCRsi recorders. This technology is commonly used in high performance computer disk drives and other high density magnetic data storage devices.
- In 1985, Ampex introduced the DIS 120i and DIS 160i dual port, data/instrumentation recorders. These made it possible for the first time to capture real time instrumentation data and then utilize the same recorder to process the data in a computer environment through its second port using SCSI-2 protocol.
- In 2005, Ampex received its 12th Emmy award for its invention of slow-motion color recording and playback. Also honored with Lifetime Achievement Awards were the members of the engineering team that created the videotape recorder when they worked for Ampex: Charles Andersen, Ray Dolby, Shelby Henderson, Fred Pfost, and the late Charles Ginsburg and Alex Maxey.
- In 2008, the music industry's annual Grammy Awards honored Ampex with its Technical Grammy Award for the company's decades of audio- and video-recording innovations, notably the pioneering Model 200 audio tape recorder.

== Sticky-shed syndrome ==
Some master tapes and other recordings predominantly from the 1970s and 1980s have degraded due to the so-called sticky-shed syndrome. When sticky-shed syndrome occurs, the binding agent deteriorates, resulting in the magnetic coating coming off the base and either sticking to the backing of the tape layer wound on top of it (resulting in dropout), or being scraped off and deposited on the tape heads while lifting the head off the tape, degrading the treble.

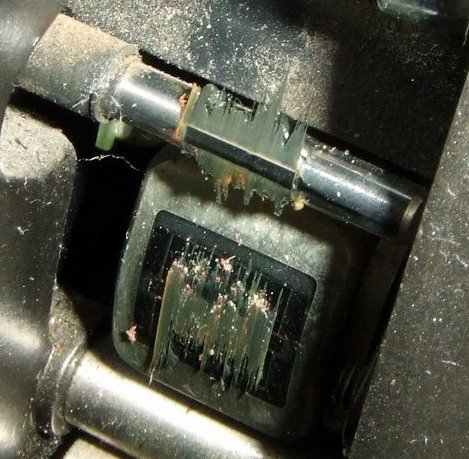
Shed on head

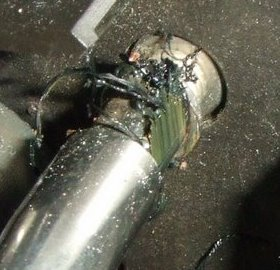
Shed on guide

Sticky shed from 1/4" Ampex 456 tape on the tape head and tape guide of a Technics RS-1500

The problem has been reported on a number of makes of tape (usually back-coated tapes), including Ampex tapes.

Ampex filed U.S. patent 5,236,790 for a baking process ("A typical temperature used is 54 °C (129 °F) and a typical time is 16 hours") to attempt to recover such tapes, allowing them to be played once more and the recordings transferred to new media. The problems have been reported on tapes of type 406/407, 456/457, 2020/373.

== Branding ==
- In 1959, Ampex acquired Orradio Industries and it became the Ampex Magnetic Tape Division.
- In 1995, Ampex divested this division, then called the Ampex Recording Media Corporation. This became Quantegy Inc., which later changed its name to the current Quantegy Recording Solutions.
- In January 2005, having previously filed for bankruptcy protection, Quantegy closed its manufacturing facility in Opelika.
- In October 2014, Ampex Data Systems Corporation was sold to Delta Information Systems but retains the rights to the Ampex name.
- In 2017, Ampex established a second business unit, Ampex Intelligent Systems (AIS), in Colorado Springs Colorado, and branded its Silicon Valley business unit Ampex Data Systems (ADS).
- In 2021, Ampex established a third business unit in Las Cruces, NM under the same name as its Silicon Valley business unit.

== Record labels ==
Ampex Records was started in 1970. Its biggest hit was "We Gotta Get You A Woman" by Todd Rundgren (as "Runt"), reaching No. 20 on the Billboard Hot 100 chart in 1970. Ampex also originated three subsidiary labels: Bearsville, Big Tree, and Lizard. Ampex Records ceased operations around 1973; Bearsville and Big Tree switched distribution respectively to Warner Bros. Records and Bell Records, and Lizard became an independent entity. Later on, Big Tree was picked up by Atlantic Records.

== Legal history ==
In 2005, iNEXTV, a wholly owned subsidiary of respondent Ampex Corporation, brought a defamation lawsuit against a poster on an Internet message board who posted messages critical of them (Ampex Corp. v. Cargle (2005), Cal.App.4th). The poster, a former employee, responded with an anti-SLAPP suit and eventually recovered his attorney fees. The case was unique in that it involved the legality of speech in an electronic public forum.

== Since 2014 ==
After becoming part of Delta Information Systems in 2014, two former subsidiaries of Ampex Corporation continued business as part of the Ampex legacy. Ampex Data Systems Corporation (ADSC) headquartered in Silicon Valley, and its subsidiary, Ampex Japan Ltd. are the only two Ampex businesses that still trade as more than "in name only" entities.

Ampex Data Systems operates out of main three locations in the USA: the headquarters in Hayward, California (about a dozen miles from the Redwood City location in Silicon Valley), a program office in Colorado Springs, Colorado and an engineering center in Las Cruces, New Mexico, as well as from the main Delta HQ in Horsham, Pennsylvania. Ampex continues to produce rugged data storage products used by government, military and commercial customers world-wide.

Since joining Delta, Ampex has grown in revenue and headcount, employing significantly more people in 2023 than were employed under the previous management structure.

== Legacy and archives ==
The Ampex video system is obsolete, but many thousands of quadruplex videotape recordings remain. Machines that survive are used to transfer archival recordings to modern digital video formats.

Ampex Corporation supported the Ampex Museum of Magnetic Recording, started by Peter Hammar in 1982.

The contents of that museum were donated to Stanford in 2001. A project is underway to curate Ampex artifacts in physical and digital form. This project will find a permanent home in Redwood City for the Ampex Museum and digital artifacts will be curated at AmpexMuseum.org This project is being funded by contributions from former Ampex employees.

== See also ==
- Ampex Golden Reel Award
- Erhard Kietz
