= Ampex 2-inch helical VTR =

Family of videotape recorders

From 1963 to 1970, Ampex manufactured several models of VTR 2-inch helical VTRs, capable of recording and playing back analog black and white video. Recording employed non-segmented helical scanning, with one wrap of the tape around the video head drum being a little more than 180 degrees, using two video heads. One video drum rotation time was two fields of video. The units had two audio tracks recorded on the top edge of the tape, with a control track recorded on the tape's bottom edge. The 2-inch-wide video tape used was one mil (0.001 in or 0.0254 mm) thick. The VTRs were mostly used by industrial companies, educational institutions, and a few for in-flight entertainment.

The capstan tape speed is 3.7 inches per second (5,600 mm/min), which provided a long record time of up to five hours on large reels. The units were 100% solid state. The Ampex 2-inch helical VTRs were popular, as they were priced much less than the 2-inch quadruplex videotape recorders used in the broadcast television industry at the time.

== VR-8000 ==
On March 14, 1961, Ampex introduced the first helical scan video recorder, the VR-8000, which recorded video using helical scan recording technology on 2-inch tape. The VR-8000 was made using a similar chassis used by Ampex's 2-inch quadruplex VTRs. Unlike the VR-660, it used only one video head on the scanner with a full alpha wrap. The first unit was working in January 1961.

Only four VR-8000s were manufactured, sold, and delivered to customers. The units had a number of problems, so they were later replaced with the VR-1100, a quadruplex-format machine. The VR-8000 was advertised by Ampex as being ideal for closed-circuit video, and for educational and training applications. Employees of Ampex at the time reported that the company kept a VR-8000 hidden behind a wall at the 1960 National Association of Broadcasters convention, kept hidden just in case a competitor showed a helical scan VTR (they could then reveal the VR-8000 if the scenario arose, as a competing product). No other companies at NAB showed a helical scan VTR, so the VR-8000 stayed hidden.

== VR 1500 ==
VR 1500 was first shown in December 1962. It was the first consumer-marketed VTR commercially available, and was also packaged as part of a high-end home entertainment center for consumers as the Signature V.

== Signature V ==
The Signature V system came with a VR-1500 VTR, a black and white video camera, and a television set with tuner. It also contained an audio system with AM/FM tuner, stereo amplifier, an open-reel audio tape recorder, and stereo loudspeakers. The video camera included with the system was very large, weighing about 100 pounds (45 kg). The complete system was sold by the Neiman-Marcus department store for about $30,000, and was featured in their 1963 catalog. The Signature V console containing all the equipment was nine feet long and weighed 900 pounds (410 kg); only one was sold.

== VR 660 ==
The VR-660 VTR was first introduced in December 1962, and was the professional version of the VR-1500. Its weight was 130 lb (59 kg) and it was 1/4 the cost of a 2-inch quad VTR. Continental Airlines used the VR-660 for movies shown as part of their in-flight entertainment system. For Apollo 11, NASA installed a specially modified, by Johns Hopkins University's Applied Physics Laboratory, VR-660 as part of a slow-scan video system for recording at Parkes Tracking Station in Australia. The slow-scan television video transmitted from Apollo 11 had a resolution of 330 TV lines, progressively scanned at 10 frames per second, recorded directly without standards conversion.

The United States Air Force used 6-hour VR-660 VTRs in B-52 bombers to record bombing runs during the Vietnam War and during training exercises. The first helical scan VTR used in broadcast TV stations was the VR-660. Later versions of the VR-660 had a color option, the VR-660C, with an external color adapter. An optional electronic editor ("Edicon") also was available in later models. The VR-600 was used both for mobile and studio TV applications. Its list price in 1963 was $14,500.

== Joint efforts with Sony and then Toshiba ==
Ampex worked with Sony in 1960 on helical VTR agreements; this joint effort did not work out as Ampex had hoped. In September 1964 Ampex entered into joint venture with Toshiba. In 1961 Sony showed a 2-inch helical VTR, the model SV-201. Only a few were made, and the 1962 cost for a SV-201 was $10,000.00. The SV-201 was the first VTR to have stop and one frame at a time playback. It did not meet U.S. Federal Communications Commission (FCC) specifications for broadcastable videotape formats for television at the time. The SV-201 was a vacuum tube-based unit and had a total weight of about 440 pounds (200 kg). The PV-100 was Sony's second model of 2-inch helical VTR, and was released in September 1962. The PV-100 was solid state and had a total weight of about 132 pounds (60 kg). It found use in the airline industry as a replacement for 8 mm and 16 mm film stock, which were used for in-flight entertainment. The VR-420 VTR was one of the Toshiba-Ampex's joint venture VTRs.

== General specifications of the VR-1500 ==
- Dimensions
  - Length: 29 7/8 inches (75.9 cm)
  - Depth: 17 3/8 inches (44.1 cm)
  - Height: 14 5/8 inches (37.1 cm)
  - Weight: 100 pounds (45 kg)
- Power requirements: 105–125 VAC, 60 Hz, 4 A peak (VTR furnished with one 117 VAC utility outlet, rated at 100 W maximum)
- Tape speed: 3.7 inches per second (9.4 cm/s)
- Recording time
  - a. 40 minutes for a 6 1/2 inch reel (750 feet; 230 m)
  - b. 90 minutes (1 h 30 min) for an 8-inch reel (1,650 feet; 500 m)
  - c. 195 minutes (3 h 15 min) for a 6 1/2 inch reel (3,600 feet; 1,100 m)
  - d. 300 minutes (5 h) for a 12 1/2 inch reel (5,540 feet; 1,690 m), at 25 pounds (11 kg).
- Frequency response: ±3 dB, 10 Hz – 3 MHz
- Signal-to-noise ratio: 40 dB or better on interchange tapes, p-p video to RMS noise
- Winding: B-wind tape comes off the right side reel, with the oxide surface facing out

== See also ==
- Type A videotape
- 1 inch type B videotape
- 1 inch type C videotape
- IVC videotape format about the IVC 2-inch helical VTR, Model 9000
- Video tape recorder (VTR)
