= Quantegy =

Manufacturer of magnetic tape

Quantegy Inc. was a manufacturer of magnetic tape and professional external hard drives based in Opelika, Alabama. Its tape products were primarily used in analog audio- and video-recording studios, but it also has some use with digital data storage devices and instrumentation recorders, along with some audiophile home hobbyists.

The company was created at the end of World War II by Major John Herbert Orr as Orradio Industries. This was a result of the US Army requiring an American supplier of magnetic tape, which was a German invention and, after the war, the German manufacturing ability was destroyed.

- In 1959, Ampex acquired Orradio Industries and it became the Ampex Magnetic Tape Division.
- In 1995, Ampex divested this division, then called the Ampex Recording Media Corporation. At the same time, 3M was also spinning off its magnetic media division. Equitable Life Insurance acquired these combined entities, which became Quantegy Inc., and later changed its name to the current Quantegy Recording Solutions, with the Ampex product line being the nominal survivor, although much use of the 3M technologies later found its way into Quantegy products, including the high end GP9 tape.
- In January 2005, having previously filed for bankruptcy protection, Quantegy closed its manufacturing facility in Opelika. This event received substantial media attention.
- On April 18, 2005, Quantegy resumed operations under new ownership.
- In January 2007, Quantegy announced that it would cease production of magnetic tape in April 2007 and was taking orders up until February 22. The only remaining manufacturers of new magnetic tape for sound recording were RMGI and ATR Magnetics.
- In April 2007, Reel Deal Pro Audio purchased the majority of Quantegy's reel-to-reel audio tape and accessories and began to sell it on its website.
- In June 2007, Quantegy ceased sales of the FHD and Black Diamond FHD3 series of hard drive products to the professional audio recording industry.
- Most of the tape production facilities, located in Opelika, Alabama, were sold in 2008.
- In 2009, Quantegy began working on reviving Quantegy 456 Studio Mastering Tape, Quantegy 499 Gold Studio Mastering Tape, GP9 Platinum Studio Mastering Tape, and the Black Diamond Series of products. But as of 2012, no progress had been made.

== See also ==
- Audio tape specifications
- Reel-to-reel audio tape recording
- Videotape
