= David Sarser =

David Sarser (January 31, 1921 – June 6, 2013) was an American musician, audio engineer and electronics designer. Born in Kansas City, Missouri, he played violin with the NBC Symphony Orchestra in the 1950s under Arturo Toscanini and worked with Les Paul in the design of the first 8 track recording deck (built for Mr. Paul by Ampex for his home studio.) He stopped playing the violin after his Stradivarius was stolen in 1962.

The stolen (formerly his) instrument, Lamoureux (1735), has been exhibited in Japan, and it is shown "unassembled" in "Violin Iconography of Antonio Stradivari: Treatises on the Life and Work of the Patriarch of Violinmakers" (Goodkind, 1972). It is widely believed to still reside in Japan. Police believe the instrument was already on a plane to Tokyo by the time it was discovered to be missing from the RCA studio.

Sarser died on June 6, 2013, in Northport, New York.
