= BEC World =

Thai media conglomerate

BEC World Public Company Limited
- Trade name: BEC World
- Formerly: Bangkok Entertainment Co., Ltd. (now a subsidiary)
- Type: Public
- Traded as: SET: BEC
- ISIN: TH0592010Z06
- Industry: Mass media
- Founded: 10 November 1967; 58 years ago (as Bangkok Entertainment Co., Ltd.)
- Founder: Vichai Maleenont
- Headquarters: Maleenont Tower Building, Floors 30-34, Rama IV Road, Khlong Tan subdistrict, Khlong Toei district, Bangkok, Thailand
- Area served: Worldwide
- Key people: Somchai Boonnamsiri (Chairman of the Board and CEO)
- Products: Television networks; Radio stations; Television programs; Content distribution; Events; Films; Music; Web portals
- Brands: Channel 3
- Revenue: ▲THB 4.62 billion (2024)
- Subsidiaries: Bangkok Entertainment Co., Ltd.; Bangkok Television Co., Ltd.; BEC International Distribution Co., Ltd.; BEC Multimedia Co., Ltd.; BECi Corporation Co., Ltd.; BEC Studio Co., Ltd.; New World Production Co., Ltd.
- Website: www.becworld.com

BEC World Public Company Limited (Thai: บริษัท บีอีซี เวิลด์ จำกัด (มหาชน)), doing business as BEC World, is a Thai media conglomerate, best known as the operator of television Channel 3. It was founded in 1990 and listed on the Stock Exchange of Thailand in 1995, though the group began doing business in 1967 as Bangkok Entertainment Co., Ltd., now a subsidiary. The business was founded by Vichai Maleenont, and continues to be majorly owned by the Maleenont family, though the company underwent major restructuring in the 2010s in response to major losses following landscape changes in the broadcast industry. Over time, the business gradually expanded, leading to the growth of content businesses, such as the Global Content Licensing division and the establishment of BEC Studio and BEC Music.

== History ==
=== Starting point ===
Bangkok Entertainment Co., Ltd. was founded on 10 November 1967 by Vichai Maleenont, partnership with Thai Television Co., Ltd., to establish a 625-line color television station. Thai Color TV Channel 3 began construction in early 1969 on Phet Kasem Road, Nong Khaem District, Bangkok, on a 6-rai (approx. 9,600 square meters) site in the beginning of 1970, the construction of the first official building of Thai TV Channel 3 was completed. The building is made up of Head Office, Transmission Equipment Building, Power Generation, and Cooling System Building. 4-storey building with a total of 4 live broadcast studios installed with large screen for realistic sky scene effects.

First broadcasting test was begun on 11 January 1970 and officially in operation on 15 March 1970. Thai TV Channel 3 officially launched TV broadcasting service in Bangkok as Thailand's first commercial television channel on 26 March 1970 at 10:00 Bangkok Time by Prime Minister Field Marshal Thanom Kittikachorn This marked the start of the contract between Bangkok Entertainment Co., Ltd. and Thai Television Co., Ltd., set to expire on 25 March 1980. The station also broadcast on FM 105.5 MHz radio, with its headquarters located at 2259 New Petchburi Road, Bangkok.

=== First Step ===
In the early years (1970-1978), the TV programs broadcast by "Thai TV Channel 3”, subsidiary of BEC World, primarily aired TV series or long films with live dubbing. The station installed two Telecine machines for broadcasting 16mm and 35mm films at 25 frames per second, with original audio broadcast simultaneously on FM 105.5 MHz.

- 1976, used the pre-recording shows, starting with the drama "Fai Pai," which aired several days a week, unlike the live shows of that era, which aired only once a month.
- 3 February 1977, the government dissolved Thai Television Co., Ltd. and established the Mass Communication Organization of Thailand (MCOT) or Channel 9, making Bangkok Entertainment Co., Ltd. its contracting partner.

=== Development ===
From 1978 to 1988, Channel 3 introduced U-matic tape, an analogue recording videocassette format, for recording dramas, advertisements, and broadcasting news via satellite, becoming the first Thai station to air global news.

- 1978, Channel 3 launched a viewer slogan competition
- 1984, Mr. Vichai Maleenont along with the executive team announced the company's official motto “Khum Kha Took Na Tee, Doo TV See Chong Sam” for the first time to celebrate its 15th anniversary.
- 1986, Channel 3 moved its studios from Nong Khaem District to Vanich Building and modernized its broadcasting equipment.
- 1987, Bangkok Entertainment Co., Ltd. signed a contract with MCOT to expand its TV network nationwide, establishing 22 transmission stations within five years, broadcasting via satellite from Bangkok.

=== Nationwide coverage ===
- 1988, Channel 3 expanded its regional network, launching its first five regional TV stations. Upgraded its production technology, introducing CCD cameras.
- 1989, total of 22 stations and followed by nine more, reaching 31 stations nationwide. This covered 89.7% of Thailand's area and 96.3% of the population.
- 1992, Channel 3 started using Betacam tapes for news and programs
- 1996, expanding its news teams to 64 teams from 24 in 1992
- 1997, began using Non-Linear ZNLE via computer and Media 100XSand launched its homepage website operated by BEC World and subsidiaries.

=== Moving forward ===
From 1998 to 2005, Channel 3 installed an 11-meter satellite dish and began using Thaicom 2 for nationwide signal transmission.

- In 1999, Channel 3 moved to the Emporium building on Sukhumvit Road. It built three new studios, and enhanced program production with computer graphics (CG). The station also upgraded its broadcasting system and expanded regional services.
- In 2000, it introduced digital Betacam SX Tape and computer graphics to prepare for the digital era and upgraded its transmission system, including energy-efficient liquid cooling technology in several provinces.

=== A giant leap for Channel 3 ===
From 2005 to 2012, Channel 3 moved to its current headquarters, owned by BEC World, at Maleenont Tower, located at 3199 Rama IV Road, Khlong Toei, Bangkok. Tower M1 serves as the office, while Tower M2 is the broadcasting operation center. The station upgraded its system to digital, using Digital SD equipment and video servers for advertising and promotions. Channel 3 also enhanced satellite transmission using Thaicom 2 with Digital MPEG-2 and switched some stations from VHF(Very-high Frequencies) to UHF(Ultra-high frequency) for better broadcast quality.

In 2007, Channel 3 signed a contract for a Digital News Studio and expanded satellite channels to improve news programs. By 2012, it introduced MAM (Media Asset Management) for production control and quality enhancement, preparing for HDTV (High-definition television) broadcasts and improving signal compression standards to AVC-Intra for international-standard programming and news.

=== Entering Digital Television era 2012 – present ===
Since 2012, Channel 3 has transitioned into the digital TV era, following the National Broadcasting and Telecommunications Commission (NBTC)'s digital switchover plan. In 2014, BEC-Multimedia won Channel 13 for Family Program, Channel 28 for Standard Definition (SD) Programs and Channel 33 for High Definition (HD Program).Due to slower-than-expected advertising market growth, the company returned licenses for channels 13 and 28 in 2019, retaining only channels 3 and 33.

Over 50 years, Channel 3 has continuously improved its technology and broadcast quality, upgrading equipment to modern standards and consistently delivering a diverse and informative lineup to satisfy its audience.

=== Organizational structure ===
Nowadays, Thai TV Channel 3 operates its business in a form of enterprise making up of 18 departments:

- The management
- Production department
- News department
- TV programs department
- Broadcasting department
- Arts department
- Engineering department
- Television techniques department
- Engineering work planning department
- Electrical power department
- Radio broadcasting station department (105.5 MHz FM)
- Administration department
- Human resource department
- Accounting department
- Finance department
- Advertisement department
- Marketing department and public relations department

== Assets and subsidiaries ==
=== Broadcasting and advertising media business group ===
- Television Business Group
  - Bangkok Entertainment Company Limited - conducts management business "Thai Television Channel 3 MCOT", which the company entered into a joint contract to transmit color television with MCOT Public Company Limited until 25 March 2020, where the company Own all airtime and is responsible for organizing the program schedule to be appropriate and always up-to-date For the goal of having the highest number of viewers at all times.
  - BEC-Multimedia Company Limited - is a company that holds a license to operate digital terrestrial television channels from the NBTC for 15 years from 25 April 2014 to 24 April 2014. in 2029 and entered into a rental contract for the use of the UHF digital network system with the Public Broadcasting Service of Thailand. The contract is effective from 1 April 2014 to 16 June 2028 and operates the business of managing 3 non-frequency television channels of 3 types as follows:
    - The high definition channel "Channel 3 HD" broadcasts content from the original Channel 3 in parallel with the consent of CAT between 10 October 2014 and 25 March 2020. Later, from midnight on 26 March 2020, the analog TV system symbol was moved back to the upper right corner. Add shadows to 3D and add the letters HD at the end to become a new symbol under the name "Channel 3, press 33" in the digital TV system until now.
    - Normal definition channel "Channel 3 SD" (broadcast ended on September 30, 2019).
    - Normal definition channel for children and families "Channel 3 Family" (broadcast ended on September 30, 2019).
- Radio Business Group
  - Bangkok Entertainment Company Limited - manages the radio station MCOT FM 105.5 MHz according to the rental contract for advertising time and programming. In the joint contract for transmitting color television with MCOT Public Company Limited until 31 January 2020 (currently Smooth FM 105.5).
  - U&I Corporation Company Limited - manages the Thailand Radio Broadcasting Station Public Relations Department FM 95.5 MHz (Hitz 955).
- Internet and mobile phone business group
  - BECI Corporation Company Limited
  - BEC-Multimedia Company Limited
- Satellite Communications Business Group (in progress)
  - Bangkok Satellite and Telecommunication Company Limited - Business project for receiving and transmitting signals via satellite system.
  - Satellite TV Broadcasting Company Limited - Satellite television business operation project (dissolution of business on October 28, 2020).
- Film Business Group
  - Major Join Film Company Limited - is a joint venture between Bangkok Entertainment and M Studio Company Limited, with Major Cineplex being the major shareholder. (formerly a joint venture with ZALEKTA Public Company Limited or formerly M Pictures Entertainment Public Company Limited) is a company that produces films for distribution both in Thailand and abroad, with M Pictures Company Limited, a subsidiary of ZALEKTA, is the distributor.

=== The business group carries out procurement and production of programs and distribute items ===
- Business group procures - produces and distributes entertainment programs and documentaries.
  - BEC World Public Company Limited
  - Rangsirotwanich Company Limited - Produces drama programs.
  - New World Production Company Limited - Produces drama programs.
  - BEC International Company Distribution Co., Ltd.
  - TVB Three Network Co., Ltd. - Provides Chinese and East Asian movie programs.
  - Bangkok Television Company Limited
  - Have A Good Dream Company Limited
- Show production business group Promote music sales and organize various campaign activities
  - Have A Good Dream Company Limited
- Continuing and supporting business group
  - BEC IT Solution Company Limited - operates an office information service business.
  - BEC Asset Company Limited - operates a business of holding and renting properties.
  - BEC Broadcasting Center Company Limited - operates a business providing studio equipment services.
  - BEC Studio Company Limited - In-house drama production company and program production service business project and studio for rent Studio equipment for production and providing post-production services (Post Production)
  - BEC News Agency Company Limited - operates the business of producing news programs for broadcast on both television and radio and also producing news to sell to other news agencies as well.
- Businesses in which BEC World Group holds shares
  - Wave Entertainment Public Company Limited - operates the business of procuring the rights to famous dramas from Thai TV Channel 3 and movies from various movie studios. Both inside and abroad and sold in videotape, VCD and DVD formats for entertainment in the residence by BEC World acquired 20% of shares.

== Major Shareholders ==
As of 23 August 2024:

- Total Shareholders: 10,008

Rank	Major Shareholders	No. of Shares	Percent Shares
1	Mr. Thaveechat Jurangkool	284,844,000	14.24%
2	Ms. Ratana Maleenont	202,339,020	10.12%
3	Mrs. Hatairat Jurangkool	189,053,100	9.45%
4	Ms. Amphorn Maleenont	149,780,200	7.49%
5	Ms. Nipa Maleenont	149,780,000	7.49%
6	Ms. Chantana Jirattitepat	98,760,000	4.94%
7	Thai NVDR Company Limited	94,223,895	4.71%
8	Mr. Mongkol Prakitchaiwattana	86,952,700	4.35%
9	Mr. Jaturont Nipatakusol	58,787,500	2.94%
10	Mr. Saran Nipatakusol	58,787,500	2.94%

== Digital Platform ==
BECi Corporation Co., Ltd., a subsidiary of BEC World, operates the digital platform 3Plus, which officially launched as the company's primary content production and distribution service. “3Plus” designed specifically for Thai audiences under the concept of "3Plus Anywhere Anytime Any Device", it allows viewers to enjoy content at their convenience. 3Plus offers viewers a wide variety of streaming options, including movies, TV shows, live sports, and re-runs, along with original and exclusive content. The platform also features content co-produced with both domestic and international partners, providing a diverse and dynamic entertainment experience.

In response to shifting viewer habits, the company launched the 3Plus digital/OTT platform, allowing audiences to access Channel 3 content anywhere, anytime with an internet connection. This platform offers a broad range of entertainment, including over 1,000 Channel 3 dramas, international series, news, cartoons, and exclusive content only available on 3Plus. The goal is to enhance business competitiveness by improving accessibility and increasing subscriber numbers.

== BEC Studio ==
BEC World Plc, the operator of Channel 3, has launched BEC Studio as a new content production house, marking a significant investment of 400 million baht in its strategic plan to expand content exports globally. The core of this investment is the Soundstage Studio, which features six studios with the capacity to produce at least 10 dramas annually. Located in Bangkok's Nong Khaem district, BEC Studio aims to position Thailand as a leading content exporter in Southeast Asia, boosting the nation's soft power, similar to South Korea's success.

BEC Studio aims to produce high-quality dramas, films, and series for various platforms, including its own Channel 3 and the 3Plus streaming service. The studio is also positioned to collaborate with international partners for co-productions, particularly targeting over-the-top (OTT) platforms.BEC Studio launched the collaboration with 12 leading Thai universities. The inaugural class, held in April 2022, included 35 participants selected from over 600 applicants. The 10-week program covered both theoretical and practical aspects of storytelling, guided by industry professionals.

BEC Studio is committed to leveraging advanced technology throughout its production processes, which encompasses:

- Production capabilities that can overcome numerous limitations, such as the ability to create any background or location, reduce production costs, and efficiently manage lighting, sound, and overall production time.
- Postproduction and Virtual Art team, such as Editing, Color Grading, Computer Graphic, and Virtual Production team; these special techniques are created from end-to-end technological equipment.

The overarching goal of BEC Studio is to elevate Thai entertainment on the global stage, positioning Thailand as a leader in content exportation within Southeast Asia. The company recognizes the potential of Thai actors in regional markets but emphasizes the need for improved production standards and internationalized scripts.

== BEC Music ==
BEC Music is a Thai pop (T-POP) music label under Channel 3, led by executive Pinkamol Maleenont. The label separated from Chandelier Music with the objective of increasing access to the target audience of the new generation, including both Thai and international fans, aligning with BEC Group's goal of becoming a Total Entertainment Company.

BEC Music has produced works since 2022, beginning with three artists under the label: Natapohn Tameeruks, Maylada Susri, and Nutticha Namwong. A full launch event for the record label was held in 2024, where BEC Music introduced additional artists such as Amanda Chalisa Obdam, Ryu Vachirawit, Smith Paswitch, and the five-member girl group consisting of Candy, Ami, Lisa, Neeya, and Jayna.

== Global Content Licensing ==
Since 2018, adjustments have been made to BEC Group's global content licensing business to reflect evolving consumer behavior and to enter additional markets. The Thai drama, The Crown Princess (Thai: ลิขิตรัก), was simulcast to China in collaboration with Tencent Video, and significant viewership was received. BEC also formed a relationship with JKN Global Media Public Company Limited to distribute its content to nations such as Southeast Asia, the Middle East, and Latin America.

BEC's strategy focuses on licensing Thai dramas to various platforms like Netflix and Viu. They have successfully entered new markets, including South Korea and Africa. Over 15,000 hours of content have been sold worldwide, with a major presence in Asia, Latin America, and Africa. As expansion occurs, related business opportunities, such as events and merchandising, are being explored.

In 2023 and 2024, content was promoted by BEC through international events like the Hong Kong International Film & TV Market, where new and existing dramas were showcased. Consistent growth has been experienced in global content licensing and digital platform revenues, with an emphasis placed on expanding into new regions and diversifying sales through multiple platforms.
