= Wachirawit Wattanaphakdipaisan =

- Born: Wachirawit Aranthanawong; October 10, 2000 (age 25); Bangkok
- Education: Thammasat University
- Occupations: Actor; Singer; Table tennis player
- Years active: 2014–present
- Agent: Channel 3 (2015–present)
- Height: 190 cm (6 ft 3 in)
- Musical career
- Genres: T-pop; Pop
- Years active: 2018–2019; 2024–present
- Labels: 4nologue (2018–2019); BEC Music (2024–present)
- Formerly of: Nine by Nine

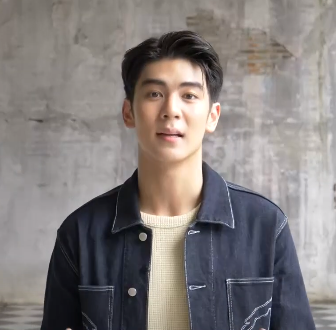
Wattanaphakdipaisan in 2023

Wachirawit Wattanaphakdipaisan (born 10 October 2000) nickname Ryu, is a Thai athlete, singer and actor under Channel 3 HD, and a former national youth table tennis player. was a member of Nine by Nine.

== Biography ==
Wachirawit Wattanaphakdipaisan (original surname: Aranthanawong) nicknamed Ryu, born on October 10, 2000, is the eldest son with one younger brother. He completed primary school at Ampornpaisan School, secondary school at BFS School, and graduated with a bachelor's degree from the Faculty of Journalism and Mass Communication, Thammasat University. Currently studying for a master's degree at the Faculty of Political Science, Bangkok Thonburi University.
