= BEC Music =

- Parent company: BEC World
- Founded: May 18, 2024; 18 months ago
- Founder: Pinkamol Maleenont
- Genre: T-Pop
- Country of origin: Thailand
- Location: Bangkok

BEC Music (Thai: บีอีซี มิวสิค) it is a Thai pop (T-pop) record label of Channel 3 HD, a subsidiary of the BEC World Group (similar to the former SP Suphamit), which separated from Chandelier Music by taking Channel 3 actors who have potential in both singing and dancing to develop them into artists, with Dew - Pinkamol Maleenont as the executive, starting to produce works since 2022 has 3 artists under the label, initially producing 5 songs. Before the full launch of the record label on May 18, 2024, at Sphere Hall, 5th floor, EmSphere Shopping Center

== Artists ==
=== Solo Artists ===
- Natapohn Tameeruks
- Maylada Susri
- Nutticha Namwong
- Phasawit Burananat
- Wachirawit Wattanaphakdipaisan
- Amanda Obdam

=== Group ===
- Blyss

== Discography ==
=== Single ===
Date	Song	Artists	Note	References
21 January 2022	BABYBOO	Natapohn Tameeruks	Feat. Gavin Duvall	
13 May 2022	100%	Natapohn Tameeruks		

== See also ==
- BEC World
- Channel 3 HD (Thailand)
