= M (videocassette format) =

Magnetic tape-based analog format

- Media type: Magnetic tape, ½-inch
- Encoding: NTSC, PAL
- Standard: Interlaced video
- Developed by: Panasonic, RCA
- Usage: Video production
- Released: 1982; 43 years ago

M is the name of a professional analog videocassette format created around 1982 by Matsushita and RCA. Developed as a competitor to Sony's Betacam format, M used the same videocassette (and the same oxide-formulated magnetic tape stock) as VHS, much the same way that Betacam was designed to take advantage of cheap and readily available Betamax videocassettes.

== Overview ==
The format was called "M" due to the shape of the threading path of the tape around the helical scan video head drum, which resembles a letter M. (This is also how the U-matic format got its name, for its U-shaped tape path in the VCR.) The M-shaped tape path was retained from VHS. An example M VCR is the Panasonic AU-300B, also sold as the Ampex ARC-40, and the M format was also sold by Ampex as the ARC format.

Like Betacam, M recorded component video and used a much faster linear tape speed. A cassette that would yield 120 minutes on a VHS VCR at SP speed would only yield 20 minutes on an M VCR. M had a similar 4-head recording system to Betacam, but the chrominance signals were recorded as two FM subcarriers of the main chrominance track FM carrier.

M found little success in the professional/industrial video production market. This might have been due to RCA's Broadcast Products division, which marketed the M format in the United States under the "Hawkeye" brand name, going out of business in 1984. Thus NBC was one of the few broadcasters to use the format. Weak marketing by Matsushita for M might have been a factor as well.

M was also marketed by Panasonic (a division of Matsushita) under the Recam (REcording CAMera) name, and by RCA as Hawkeye.

M was succeeded in 1986 by the MII format developed by Panasonic, using a similar-sized cassette with completely different signal processing and a metal-particle tape formulation.

== See also ==
- MII (videocassette format)

== Sources ==
- lionlamb.us List of videotape formats past and present, with a mention of the M format
- mediacollege.com The M Format
- ultimatewebdesigning.com List of videotape formats past and present, the M format listed
- Sony Betamax Case Report
- DC Video on M
- The History of Television, 1942 to 2000, page 194, By Albert Abramson, Christopher H. Sterling
- Encyclopedia of television, Volume 1, page 251, By Horace Newcomb
- The History of Television, 1942 to 2000, page 214, By Albert Abramson, Christopher H. Sterling, NBC use
