= MII (videocassette format) =

Magnetic tape-based format

- Media type: Magnetic tape
- Encoding: NTSC, PAL
- Read mechanism: Helical scan
- Write mechanism: Helical scan
- Standard: Interlaced video
- Developed by: Panasonic
- Usage: Video production
- Released: 1986; 39 years ago

MII is a professional analog recording videocassette format developed by Panasonic in 1986 in competition with Sony's Betacam SP format. It was technically similar to Betacam SP, using metal-formulated tape loaded in the cassette, and utilizing component video recording.

MII is sometimes incorrectly referred to as M2; the official name uses Roman numerals, and is pronounced "em two". Just as Betacam SP was an improved version of its predecessor Betacam (originally derived from Betamax) with higher video and audio quality, MII was an enhanced development of its predecessor, the failed M format (originally derived from VHS). There were two sizes of MII tape, the larger of which is close to VHS size and has a running time of up to around 90 minutes, the smaller tape was about half the size and runs up to around 20 minutes, and was also the size in which head cleaner tapes were supplied.

Panasonic manufactured mains-powered MII editing and playback decks which accepted both the large and small tapes, as well as portable recorders which used only the small cassette.

Unlike M, MII was somewhat successful when it was first launched, with customers like NBC in the US and NHK in Japan using it for electronic news gathering (ENG), and PBS in the USA using it in the late 1980s to delay their television network programming by 3 hours on broadcast delay for later airing on the West Coast. But MII also suffered from lackluster marketing, a lack of customer support and public relations from Panasonic and Matsushita (Panasonic's parent company), and most importantly, a lack of reliability due to said lack of support for repair and service. This resulted in MII not being nearly as successful as Betacam SP. NBC eventually dropped the format in the early 1990s for Panasonic's D3 Format, and ultimately began broadcasting all of its television programming and television commercials from digital video servers in the 2000s.

In the UK, MII was used in the late 1980s and early 1990s by three ITV franchisees; Thames Television, Anglia Television and TV-am, whilst all other contemporary broadcasters adopted Sony's Betacam SP. Of the three, Thames and TV-am lost their licences in the 1991 ITV franchise auctions, depleting still further the already scant MII usage in the country.

MII is barely used nowadays, and spare parts as well as tapes for the format are now hard to come by, although used MII equipment can occasionally be found cheaply on the professional video equipment market and online auctions. MII faded earlier than other analog video formats, in favor of digital tapes such as Digital Betacam, DVCAM and DVCPro, which were themselves superseded by high definition discs and cards. A small number of specialist companies maintain old MII machines in order to offer a transfer service for archive footage to modern formats.

== Recording method ==
The MII format was completely analog, with four audio channels. Six tracks were recorded on the tape: two by the moving heads and four by the stationary head.

Beginning at the top of the tape, the first two tracks were audio channels two and one, recorded linearly by the stationary head. Below these were diagonal tracks recorded by the moving head in a method known as helical scan, which increases the effective tape speed and thus the bandwidth needed for storing video. There were two tracks called C and Y, carrying frequency modulated video components. The C track also contained audio channels three and four, frequency modulated. Below the moving head tracks, the last two tracks carried control and time code information, respectively, from the stationary head. The control signal was used to synchronize the moving heads for playback.

Video was split among the C and Y tracks: Luminance was simply frequency modulated and written solely to the Y track. The two chrominance signals, Pr and Pb, were combined by chrominance time compressed multiplexing (CTCM), which is a type of time division multiplexing. The resulting CTCM signal was frequency modulated and written to the C track.

Since there was no more room on the face of the tape for the other two audio channels, they were frequency modulated and recorded on the C track. In other words, audio channels three and four and the video chrominance (CTCM) signal were all frequency multiplexed and recorded on one track by the moving heads.

== Gallery ==
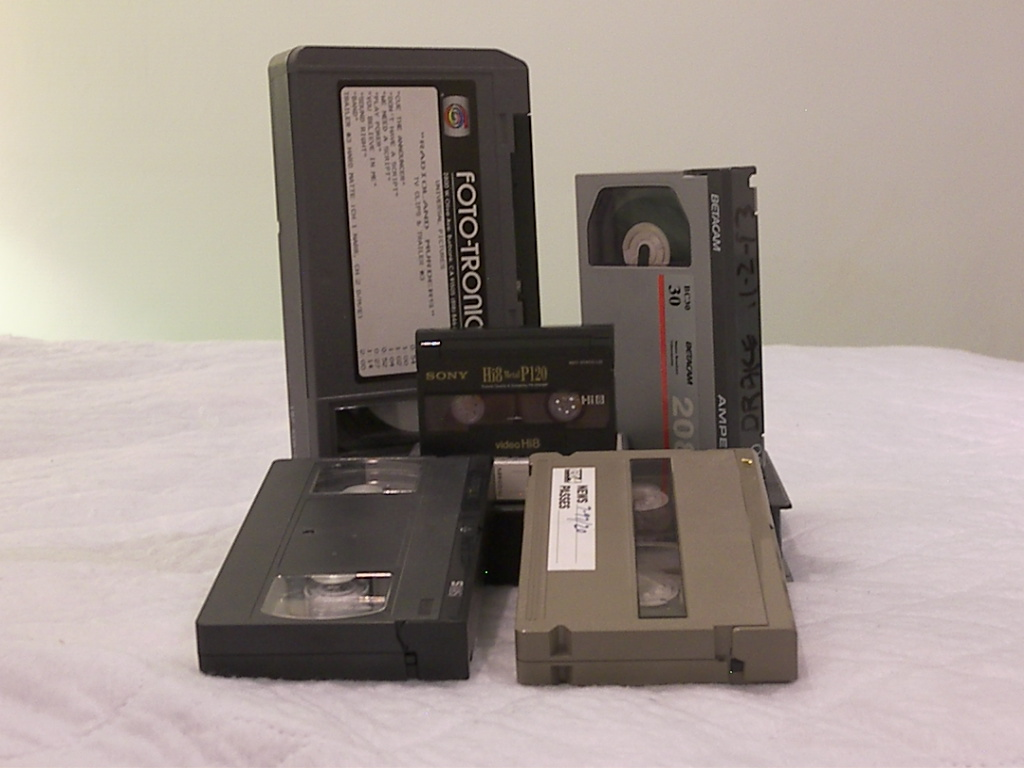
S-VHS and MII tapes in comparison with other common formats.

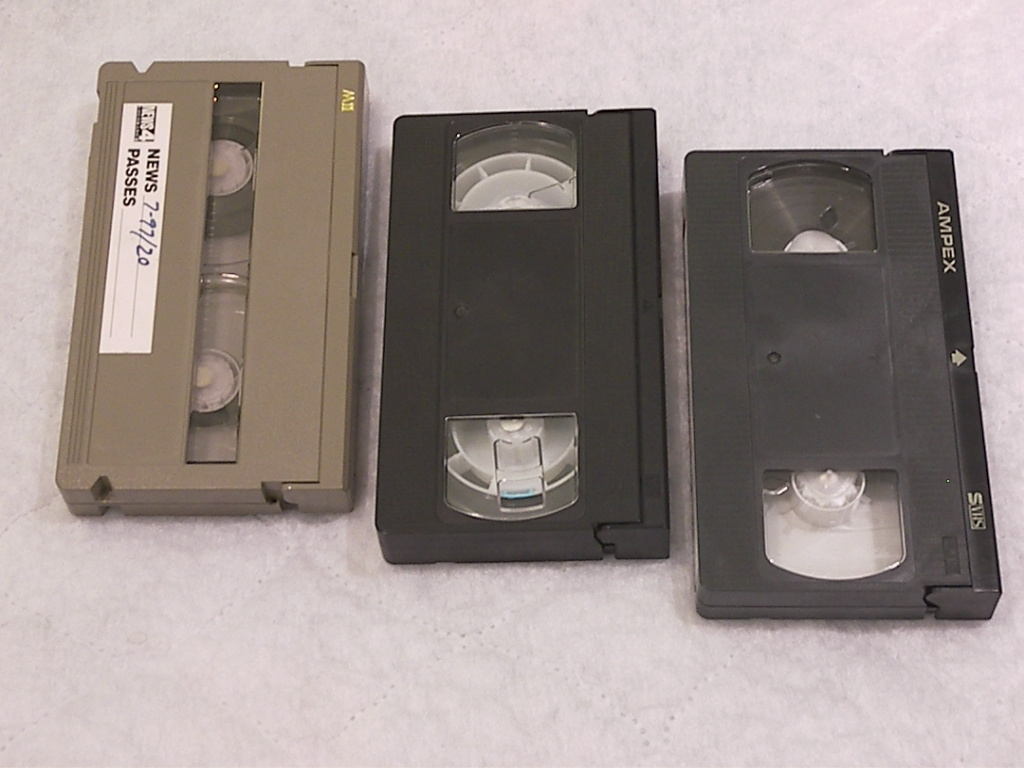
MII, VHS, and S-VHS cassettes.

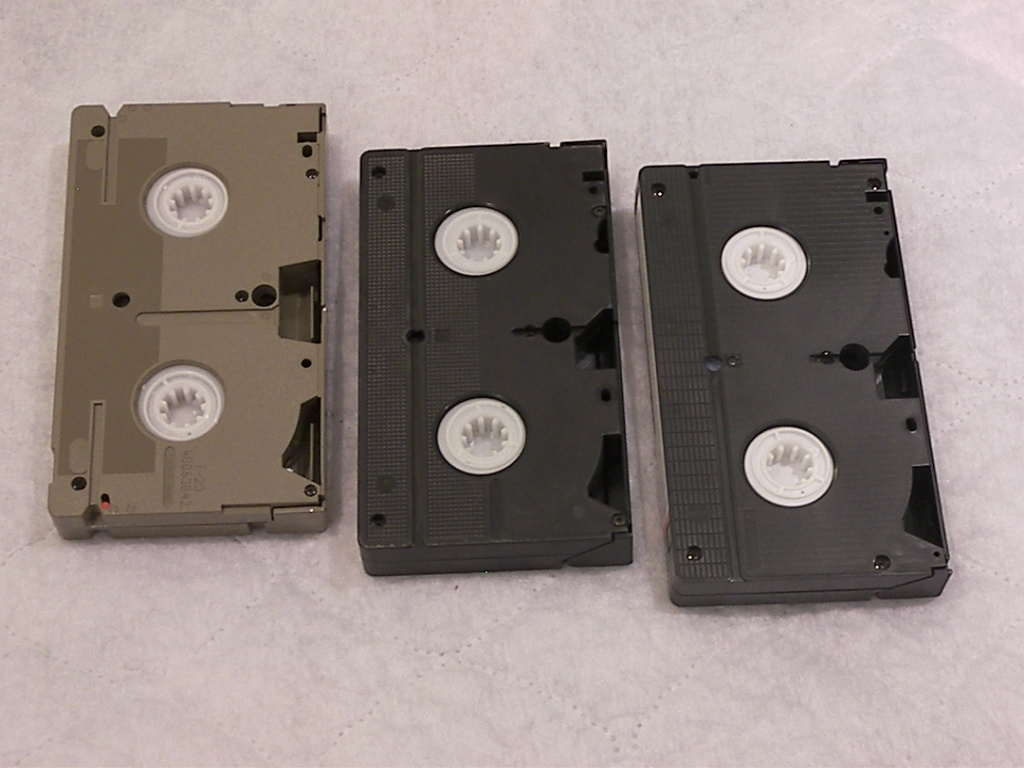
MII, VHS, and S-VHS bottoms, showing MII differences.

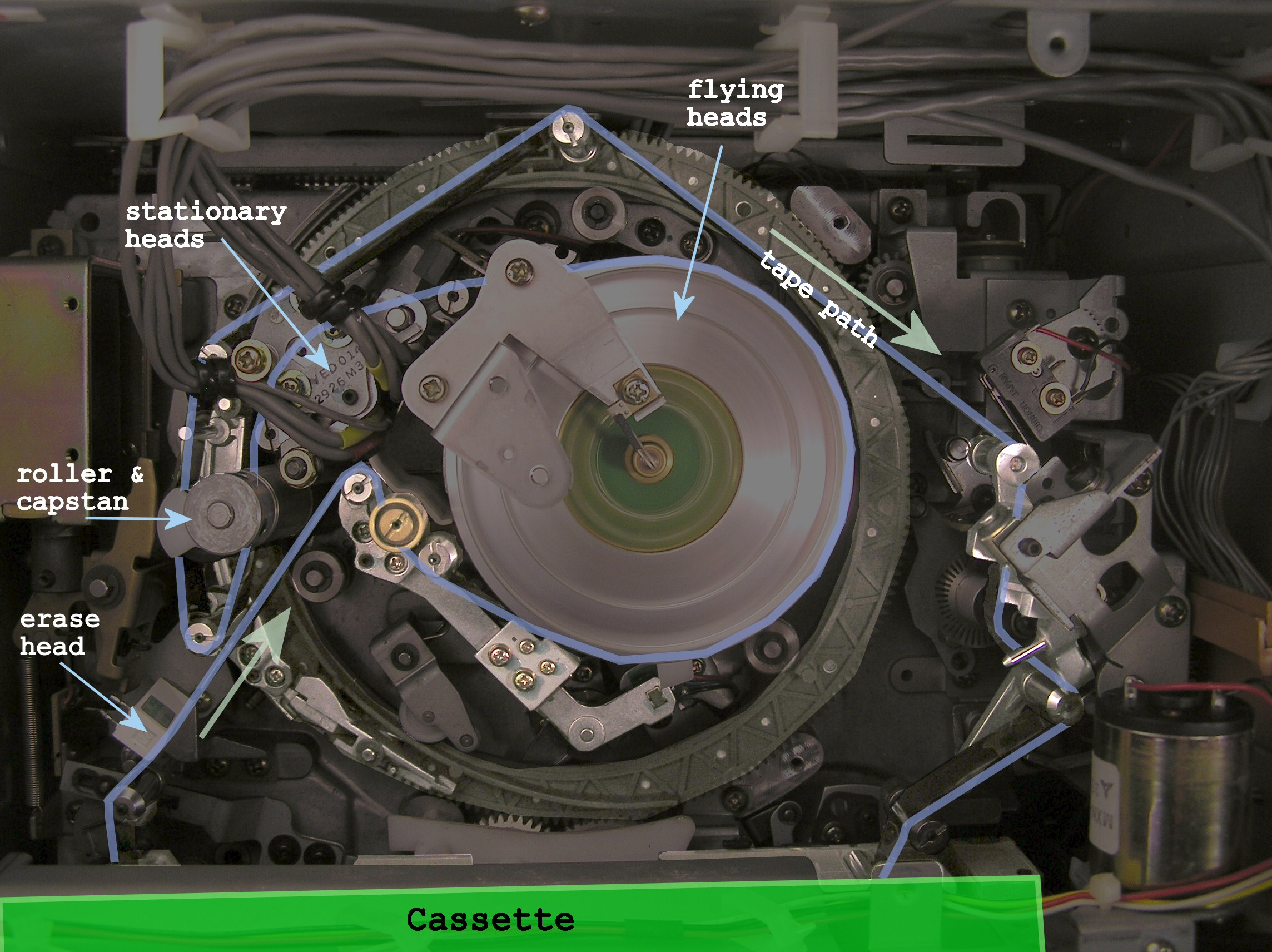
AU-65-P VCR playing MII tape. Loading mechanism highlighted.

== See also ==
- M
