= Maleenont family =

Thai Chinese business family

Maleenont มาลีนนท์
- Current region: Bangkok
- Origin: Bang Khla, Chachoengsao, Thailand
- Founded: 20th century
- Founder: Vichai Maleenont
- Current head: Pravit Maleenont

The Maleenont family (Thai: มาลีนนท์) is a Thai family of Chinese descent, consisting of the descendants of media mogul Vichai Maleenont (16 August 1919 – 8 October 2018), who founded BEC World, the operator of television Channel 3. He had four sons: Prasan, Pravit, Pracha, and Prachum; and four daughters: Ratana, Nipa, Amphorn, and Ratchanee Nipatakusol. Together, they and their descendants own 43% in BEC World, and are ranked by Forbes as the 47th richest in Thailand as of 2019.

Vichai's three elder sons were involved in the operations of Channel 3 from early on. Pravit emerged as leader of its management, but left his post as managing director in 2012 due to health concerns. Prasan inherited leadership of the company from Vichai in 2016, but predeceased his father shortly after, passing the role to youngest brother Prachum. Pracha had entered into politics with the Thai Rak Thai Party around 2000, holding several successive ministerships, but was sentenced to jail for corruption in 2013 and fled the country.
