= Betacam =

Family of videocassette formats

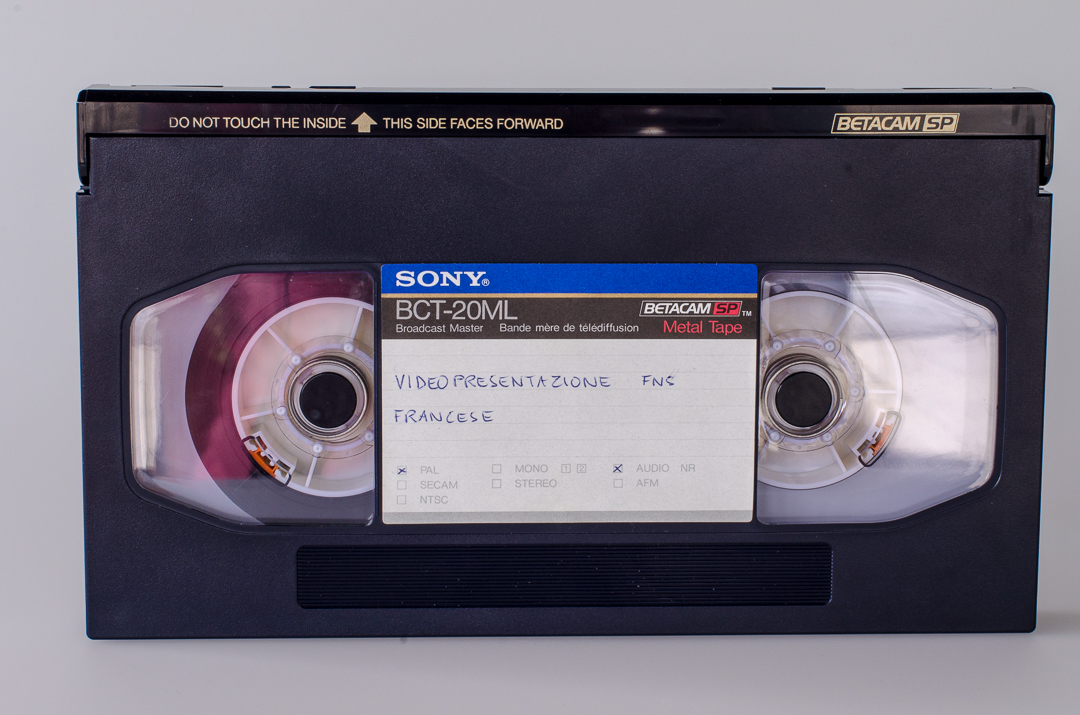
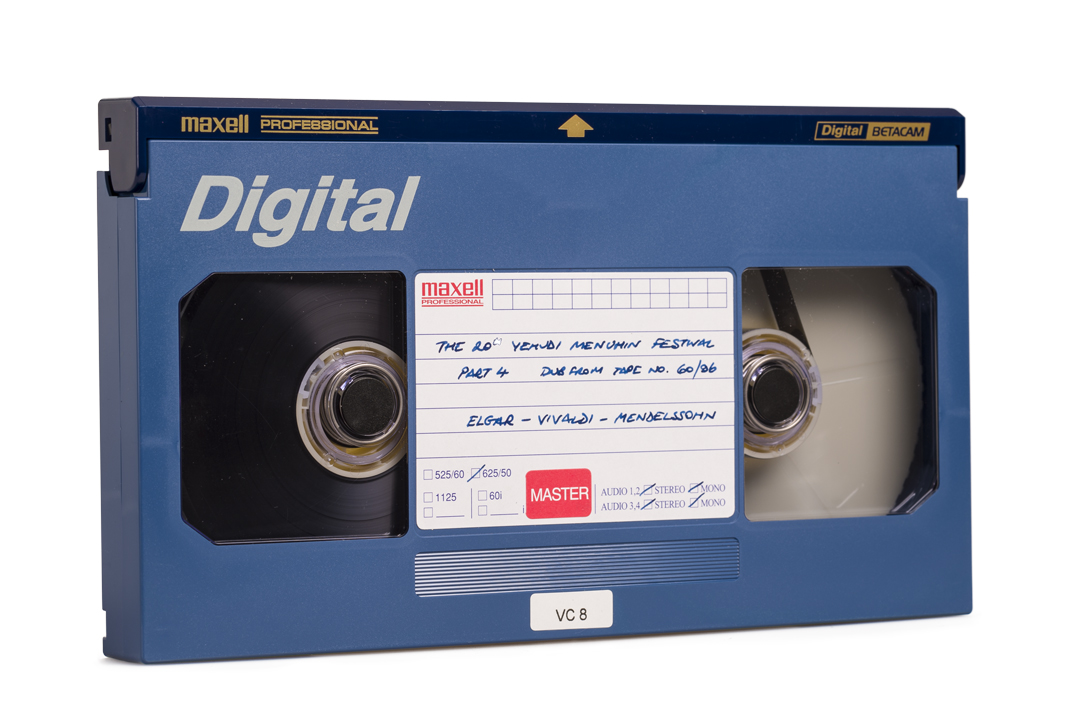
- A black Betacam SP videocassette (L size) from Sony; a blue Digital Betacam videocassette from Maxell
- Media type: Magnetic cassette tape, ½-inch
- Encoding: NTSC, PAL, digital video, high-definition video
- Read mechanism: Helical scan
- Write mechanism: Helical scan
- Standard: Interlaced video, progressive video
- Developed by: Sony
- Usage: Video production
- Released: August 7, 1982; Lifespan: August 1982 – March 2016; Technical Support 1982–present (vary by region)

Betacam is a family of professional half-inch tape video formats and videocassette products, developed by Sony from 1982. In colloquial use, Betacam singly is often used to refer to a Betacam camcorder, a Betacam tape, a Betacam video recorder or the format itself. Both analog, and later, digital, variants of the Betacam format have existed.

The original Betacam format, which used the same cassettes as Betamax, supplanted the three-quarter-inch U-Matic format, which Sony had co-introduced in 1971. In addition to improvements in video quality by using split component video, the Betacam configuration of an integrated professional video camera and recorder led to its rapid adoption by electronic news gathering (ENG) organizations. In the late 1980s, an upgraded version called Betacam SP was introduced and gradually replaced film formats for single camera documentary shooting. Digital Betacam (often referred to as DigiBeta) was released in 1993 and went on to become the single most successful professional broadcast television tape format. In 1997 HDCAM made its debut, recording in high-definition (HD) resolution using the Betacam shape videocassettes. An upgraded version of HDCAM, HDCAM SR, was introduced in 2003.

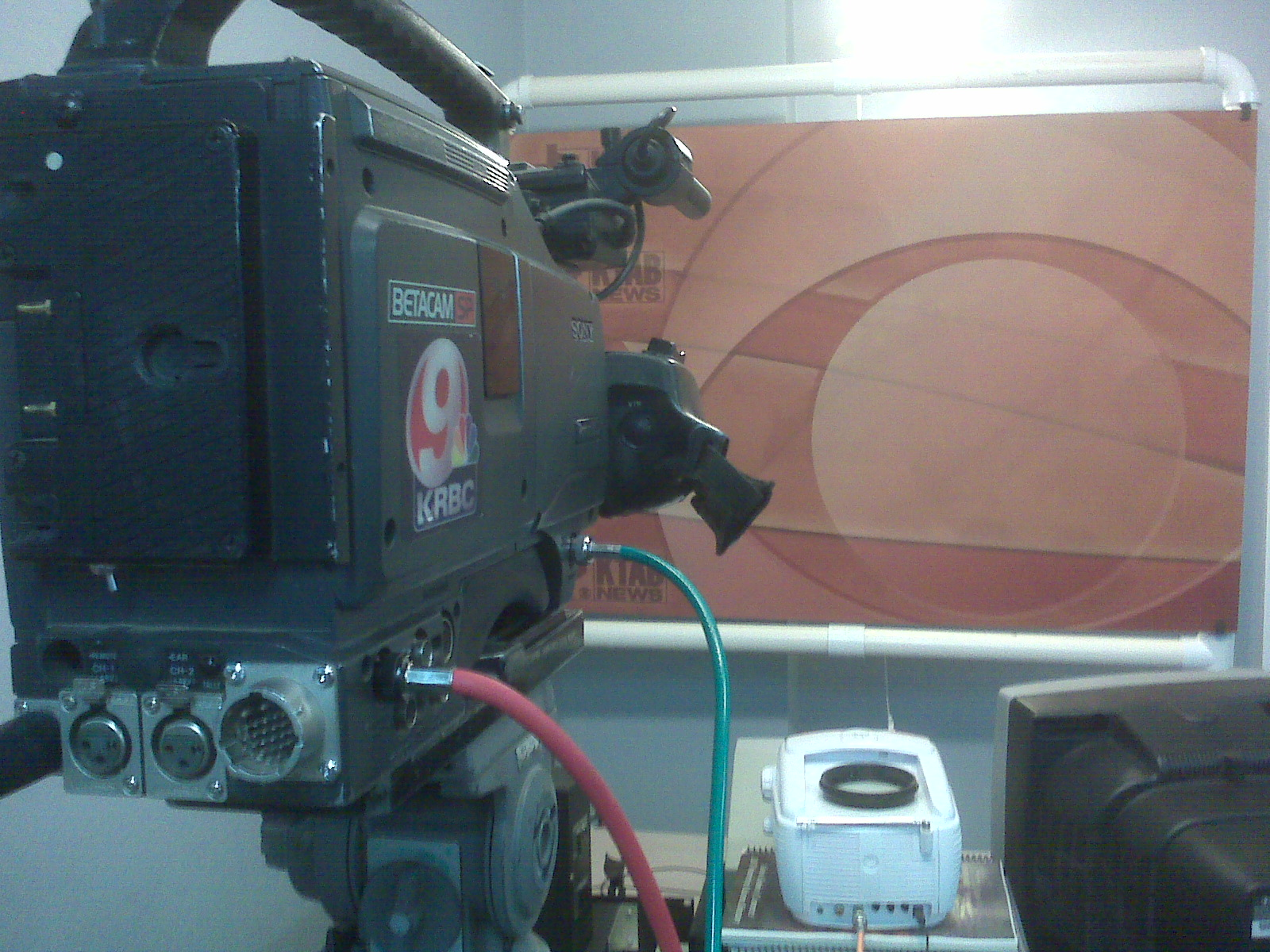
A Betacam SP format camcorder (Sony UVW-100B) in the newsroom of KTAB-TV/KRBC-TV, 2009

By the late 2000s and the 2010s, Betacam use and products started being phased out in television studio environments by new tapeless products, typically those using flash memory. In 2016, Sony ceased production of all half-inch videotape recorders and players, including Digital Betacam, HDCAM and HDCAM SR. It has ceased production of all blank half-inch tapes in 2023.

== Cassettes ==
All Betacam variants use the same shape videocassettes. The cassettes are available in two sizes: S (short or small) and L (long or large). The Betacam camcorder can only load S magnetic tapes, while television studio sized video tape recorders (VTR) designed for video editing can play both S and L tapes.

The cassette shell and case for each Betacam cassette is colored differently depending on the format.

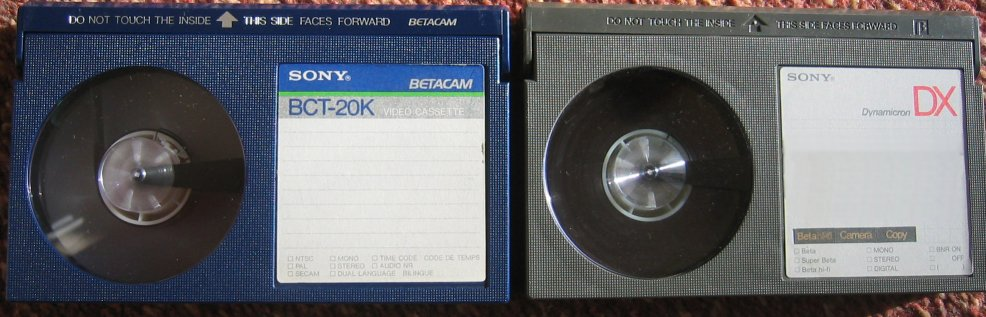
An early Betacam cassette (left) next to a Betamax cassette (right)

The S size videocassettes are interchangeable with Betamax (though the recordings themselves are not).

=== Third-party support ===
Betacam and Betacam SP tape cassette shells varied in color depending on the manufacturer. Many companies sold Betacam tapes, sometimes of their own manufacture, sometimes re-branded. Fuji, Maxell, Ampex/Quantegy, BASF/EMTEC and 3M were just some of the major brands to do so.

== Analog Betacam ==
=== Original Betacam format ===
The original Betacam format was launched on August 7, 1982, as a relatively inexpensive cassette based physical format. It is an analog component video signal format, storing the luminance (Y), in one track and the chrominance, on another, as alternating segments of the R-Y and B-Y components performing Compressed Time Division Multiplex, or CTDM. This splitting of channels allows higher quality recording with 300 lines of horizontal luminance resolution and 120 lines of chrominance resolution. Image quality is significantly improved compared to domestic Betamax and the professional U-Matic formats.

The original Betacam cassettes, loaded with ferric-oxide tape, were identical in overall design and size (15.1 × 9.5 × 2.5 cm) to consumer-grade Betamax, introduced by Sony in 1975. Betacam cassettes could be used in a Betamax VCR; likewise, a blank Betamax tape would work on a Betacam deck. However, in later years, Sony discouraged this practice, suggesting that the internal tape transport of Betamax cassette was not well suited to the faster tape transport of Betacam. In particular, the guide rollers tend to be noisy.

Although there is a superficial similarity between Betamax and Betacam in that they use the same tape cassette, (Note: Also, some Betacam and Betamax portables share the same batteries.) they are incompatible formats. Betamax records relatively low-resolution video using a heterodyne color recording system and only two recording heads, while Betacam uses four heads to record in component format, at a much higher linear tape speed of 10.15 centimetres per second (4.00 in/s) compared with Betamax's 1.87 centimetres per second (0.74 in/s), resulting in much higher video and audio quality. A typical L-750 length Betamax cassette that yielded about 3 hours of recording time on a Betamax VCR at its B-II Speed (NTSC), or on PAL, only provided 30 minutes' record time on a Betacam VCR or camcorder.

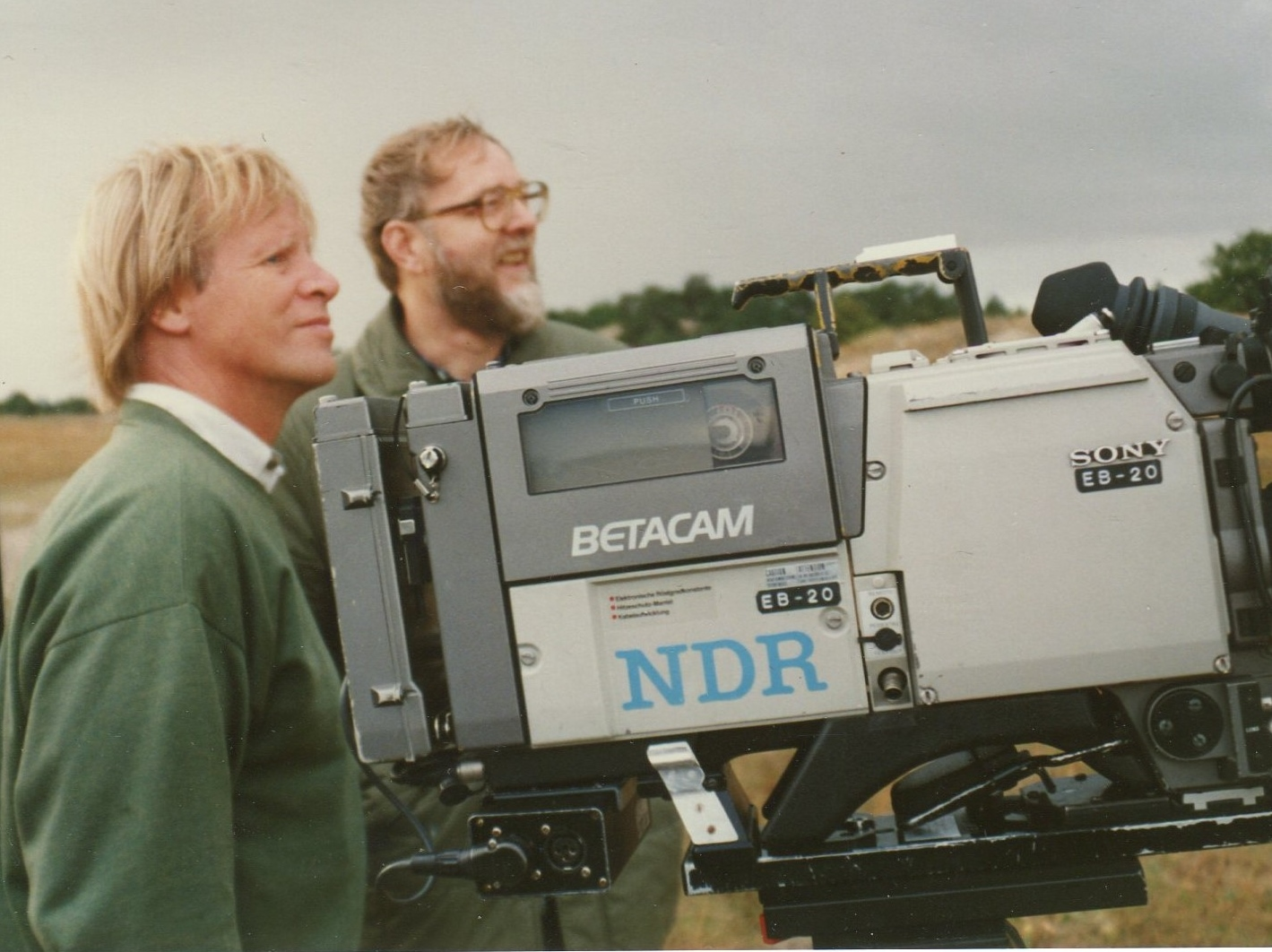
A Betacam camcorder in use outside by NDR

Betacam was initially introduced as a camera line along with a docking companion VTR and a standalone video cassette player. The first cameras were the BVP-3, which utilized three Saticon tubes, the BVP-30, which utilized three Plumbicon tubes, and the BVP-1, which used a single tri-stripe SMF (Saticon Mixed Field) Trinicon tube. These three cameras could be operated standalone or with their docking companion VTR, the BVV-1 (quickly superseded by the BVV-1A), to form the BVW-1 (BVW-1A) integrated camcorder. Those decks were record-only. The only transport controls on the deck were eject and rewind. The docked camera's VTR button started and paused the tape recorder. Later, the Betacam SP docking decks had full transport controls (except a record button) but tapes could not be played back except in the camera's viewfinder in black-and-white only. Sony then came out with the playback adapter, the VA-500, a separate portable unit that connected via a multi-pin cable and had a composite video out jack for color playback. At first, color playback required the studio source deck, the BVW-10, which could not record, only play back. It was primarily designed as a feeder deck for A/B roll edit systems, usually for editing to a one-inch Type C or three-quarter-inch U-matic cassette edit master tape. There was also the BVW-20 field playback deck, which was a portable unit with DC power and a handle, that was used to verify color playback of tapes in the field. Unlike the BVW-10, it did not have a built-in time base corrector (TBC).

With the popular success of the Betacam system as a news acquisition format, the line was soon extended to include the BVW-15 studio player and the BVW-40 studio edit recorder. The BVW-15 added dynamic tracking, which enabled clear still frame and jog playback, something the BVW-10 could not deliver. The BVW-40 enabled, for the first time, editing to a Betacam master, and if set up and wired correctly, true component video editing. It was also possible to do machine-to-machine editing between a BVW-10 or 15 and BVW-40 without an edit controller—a single serial cable between the units was all that was required to control the player from the recorder to perform simple assemble and insert editing. Additionally, there were two field models introduced, the BVW-25 field recorder, and the BVW-21 play-only portable field deck.

At its introduction, many insisted that Betacam remained inferior to the bulkier one-inch type C and B videotapes, the standard broadcast production formats of the late 1970s to mid-1990s. Additionally, the maximum record time for both the cameras and studio recorders was only half an hour, a severe limitation in television production. There was also the limitation that high-quality recording was only possible if the original component signals were available, as they were in a Betacam camcorder. If the recording started as composite video, re-converting it to component for recording and then eventually back to composite for broadcast caused a drop in quality compared to recording component video directly.

Ampex, Thomson SA, BTS each sold OEM versions of some of the Sony VTRs and camcorders at various times in the 1980s and 1990s. Other than nameplates, these models were identical to the Sony models. Internal components still bore the Sony name.

=== Betacam SP ===
Logo of Betacam SP

Betacam SP (commonly referred to as Beta SP) was released in 1986 in Japan before being released internationally the following year. It increased horizontal resolution to 340 lines. While the quality improvement of the format itself was minor, the improvement to the VTRs was significant, particularly in quality and features. In addition to the existing cassette, a larger cassette (25.3 × 14.4 × 2.5 cm) was introduced with 90 minutes of recording time. Betacam SP (for Superior Performance) became the industry standard for most TV stations and high-end production houses until the late 1990s. Despite the format's age and its discontinuation in 2001, Betacam SP remained a common standard for standard-definition video post-production into the 2010s. The recording time is the same as for Betacam, 30 and 90 minutes for S and L, respectively. Tape speed is slightly slower in machines working in the 625/50 format, increasing tape duration by one minute for every five minutes of run time; a 90-minute tape will record 108 minutes of video in PAL.

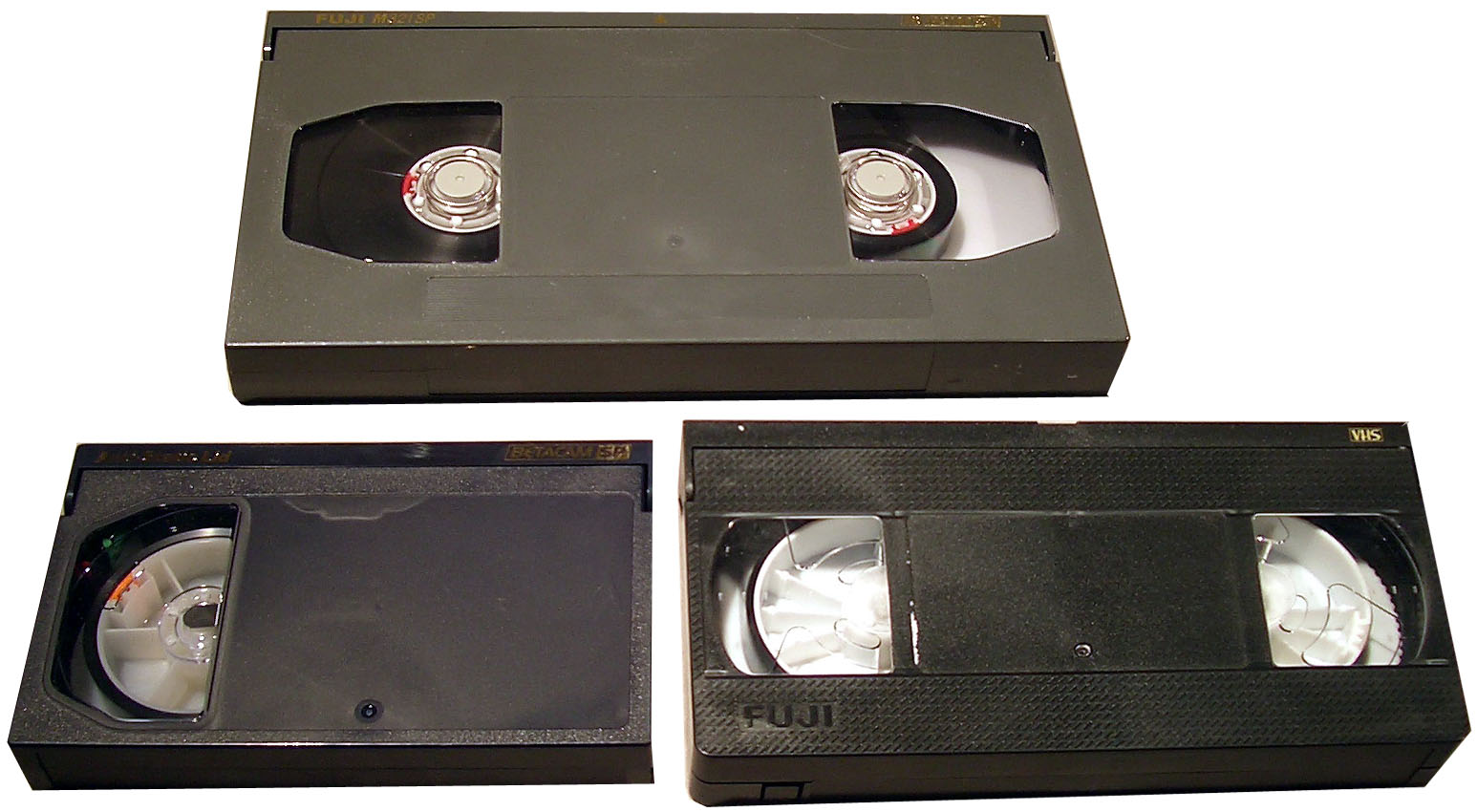
A size comparison between Betacam SP L (top), Betacam SP S (bottom-left), and VHS (bottom-right)

Betacam SP is able to achieve its namesake Superior Performance over Betacam due to the fact that it uses metal-formulated tape as opposed to Betacam's ferric oxide tape. Sony designed Betacam SP to be partially forward compatible with standard Betacam; Betacam SP tapes recorded on Betacam SP decks can be played (but not recorded) in oxide-era Betacam VTRs (such as the BVW-15 and BVW-40 mentioned earlier). Betacam SP-branded tapes cannot be used for recording in consumer Betamax VCRs like oxide Betacam tapes, due to Betacam SP's metal-formulation tape causing the video heads in a Betamax deck to wear prematurely, which are made of a softer material than the heads in a standard Betacam deck. However, Betacam SP tapes can be used without a problem in ED Beta VCRs, since the ED Beta format uses metal-formulated tape as well.

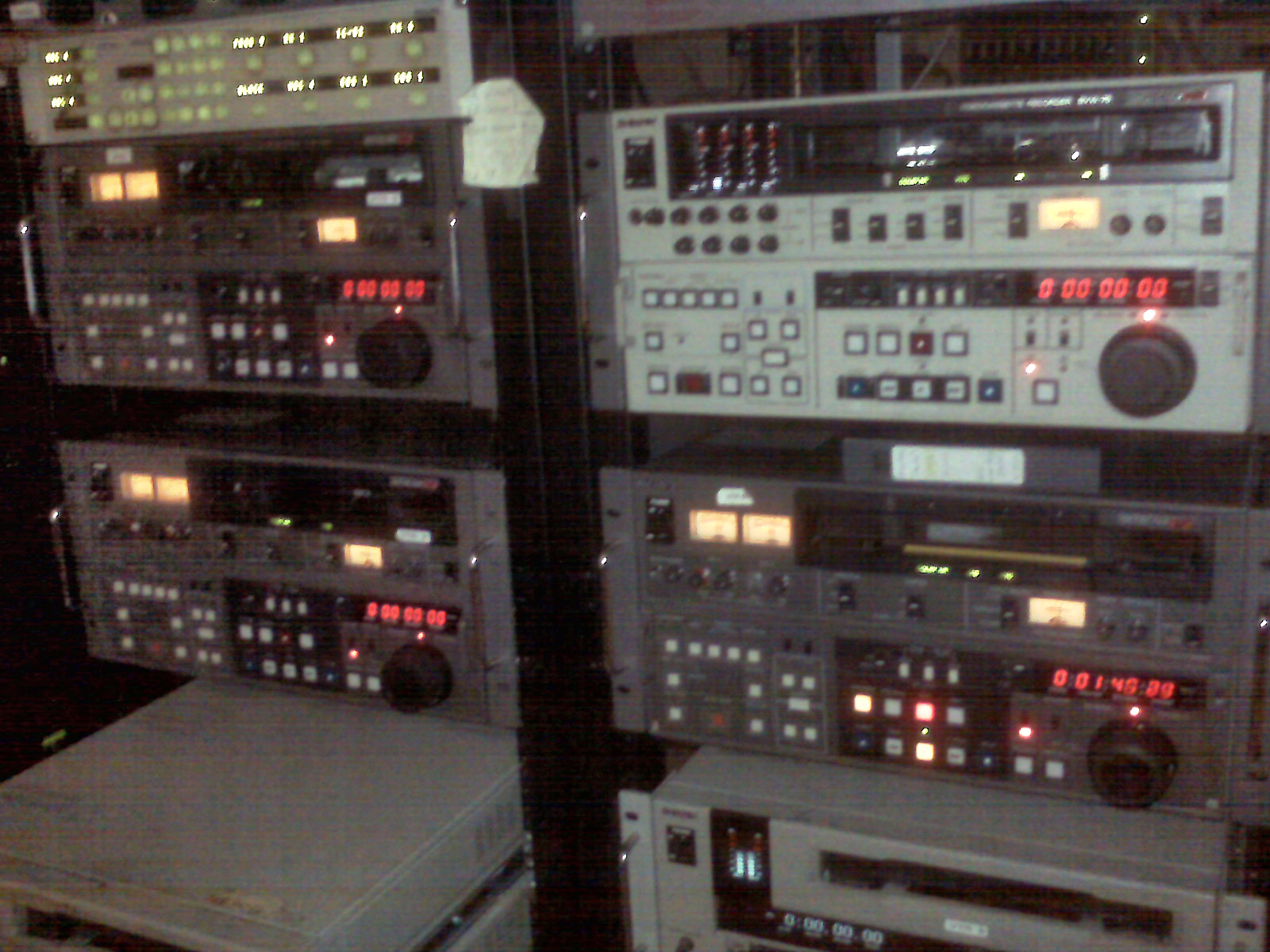
Three VTRs on 19-inch racks

The new Betacam SP studio decks were the players: The BVW-60 and BVW-65; and the Edit Recorders: the BVW-70 and BVW-75. The BVW-65 and BVW-75 feature dynamic tracking. The BVV-5 was the Betacam SP dockable camera back, which could play back in color if its companion playback adapter was used. A new SP field recorder, the BVW-35, possessed the added benefit of a standard RS-422 serial control port that enabled it to be used as an edit feeder deck. Though the four new studio decks could utilize the full 90-minute Betacam SP cassettes, the BVW-35 remained limited to the original Betacam small 30-minute cassette shells. Answering a need for a basic office player, Sony also introduced the BVW-22, a much less expensive desktop model that could be used for viewing and logging 90-minute cassettes of both Betacam SP and oxide types, but could not be configured into an edit system and offered only composite video output.

Sony followed up with the SP field recorder BVW-50 that could record and play the large-size 90-minute cassettes. After this, the deck line was relatively stagnant and incredibly popular for a decade, aside from some specialty models that could record digital audio.

Until the introduction of the BVW-200 camera, the camera and recorder configuration was a docking system. The BVW-200 was an integrated camera recorder system. It sacrificed the flexibility of a docking camera in support of weight reduction. By the mid-1990s, non-docking camcorders became the most popular design.

The final Betacam SP camcorder was the BVW-D600, which paired a digital professional video camera front section, very similar to the one on the DigiBeta DVW-700, with an integrated Betacam SP recorder. Like every other Betacam camera system, and unlike the DigiBeta DVW-700, the camera could not play back in color without the use of an outboard adapter.

In 1991, the less-expensive PV line of Betacam SP decks was introduced. The PV line consisted of four models: the full-sized PVW-2600 (VTP), PVW-2650 (VTP with dynamic tracking allowing up to x3 playback speed, whereas the BVW line only offered x2 playback) and PVW-2800 (VTR) editing decks, and the PVV-3 camera-dockable VTR. These machines were of similar build to the original BV series machines, but lacked the third and fourth audio channels. In 1993, the far less expensive UVW series debuted. These machines were considerably simpler, somewhat lower quality, and were designed primarily to be used as companions to computer systems, for industrial video, and other low-cost uses. The UVW decks possessed very limited front panel controls, no jog and shuttle (except by use of a DSRM-10 cable remote control); and with time base corrector (TBC) available only with an optional remote TBC controller. The line included the UVW-1800, a very popular editing VTR (and companion UVW-1600 edit VTP), and the non-editing UVW-1400 VTR, and UVW-1200 VTP. The UVW-100 (and later 100B) one-piece camcorder rounded out the UVW series.

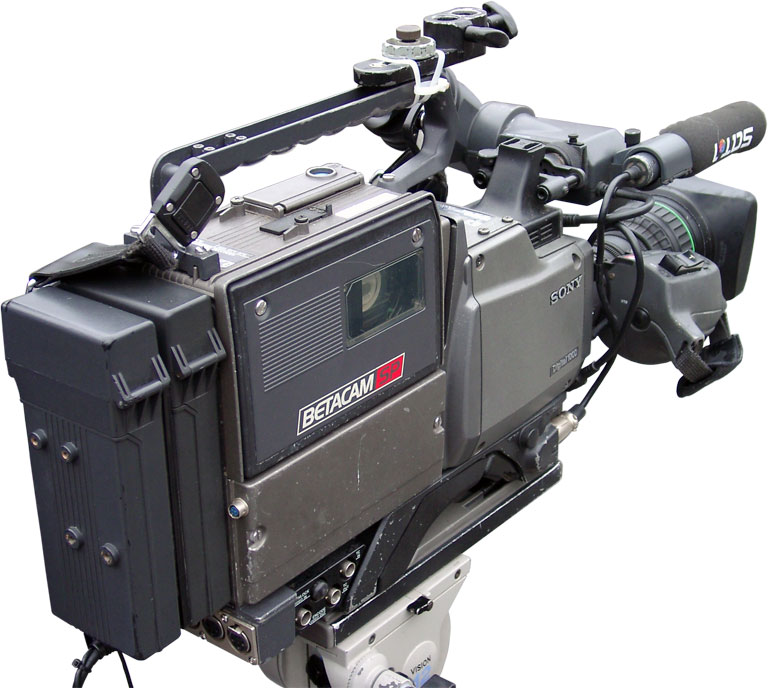
A Betacam SP KMJ camcorder

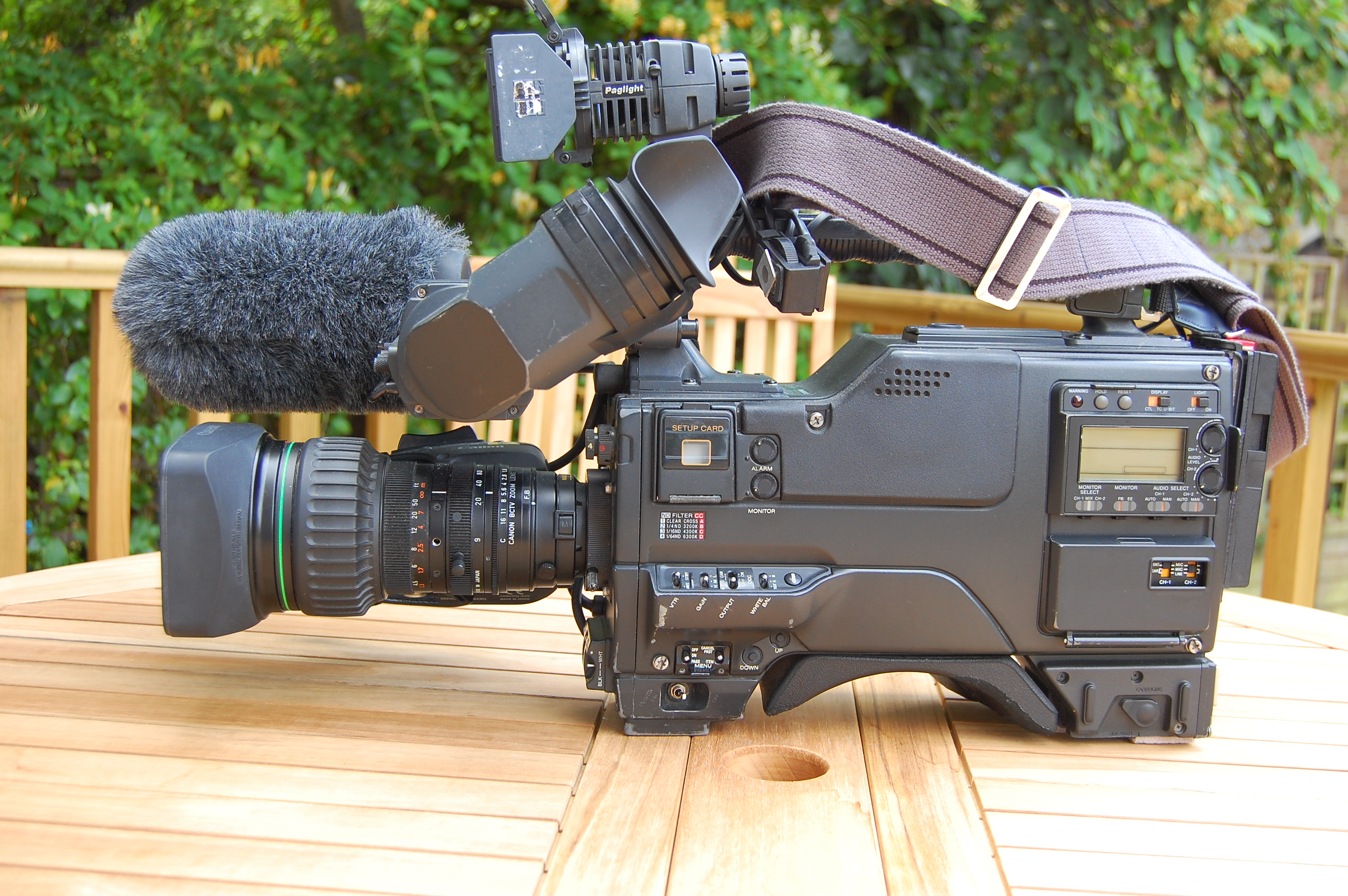
The left side of a Sony BVW-D600P camcorder

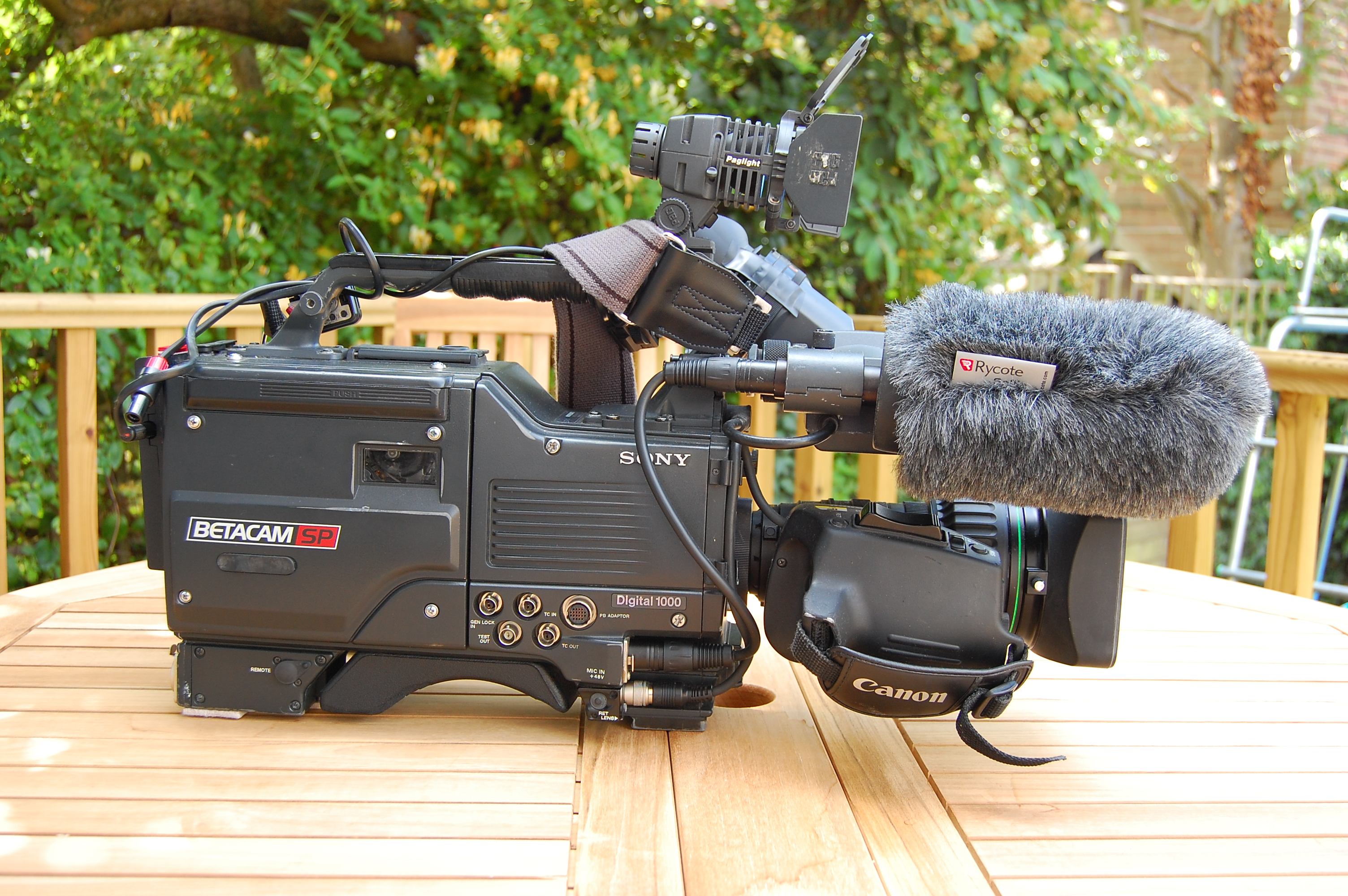
The right side of a Sony BVW-D600P camcorder

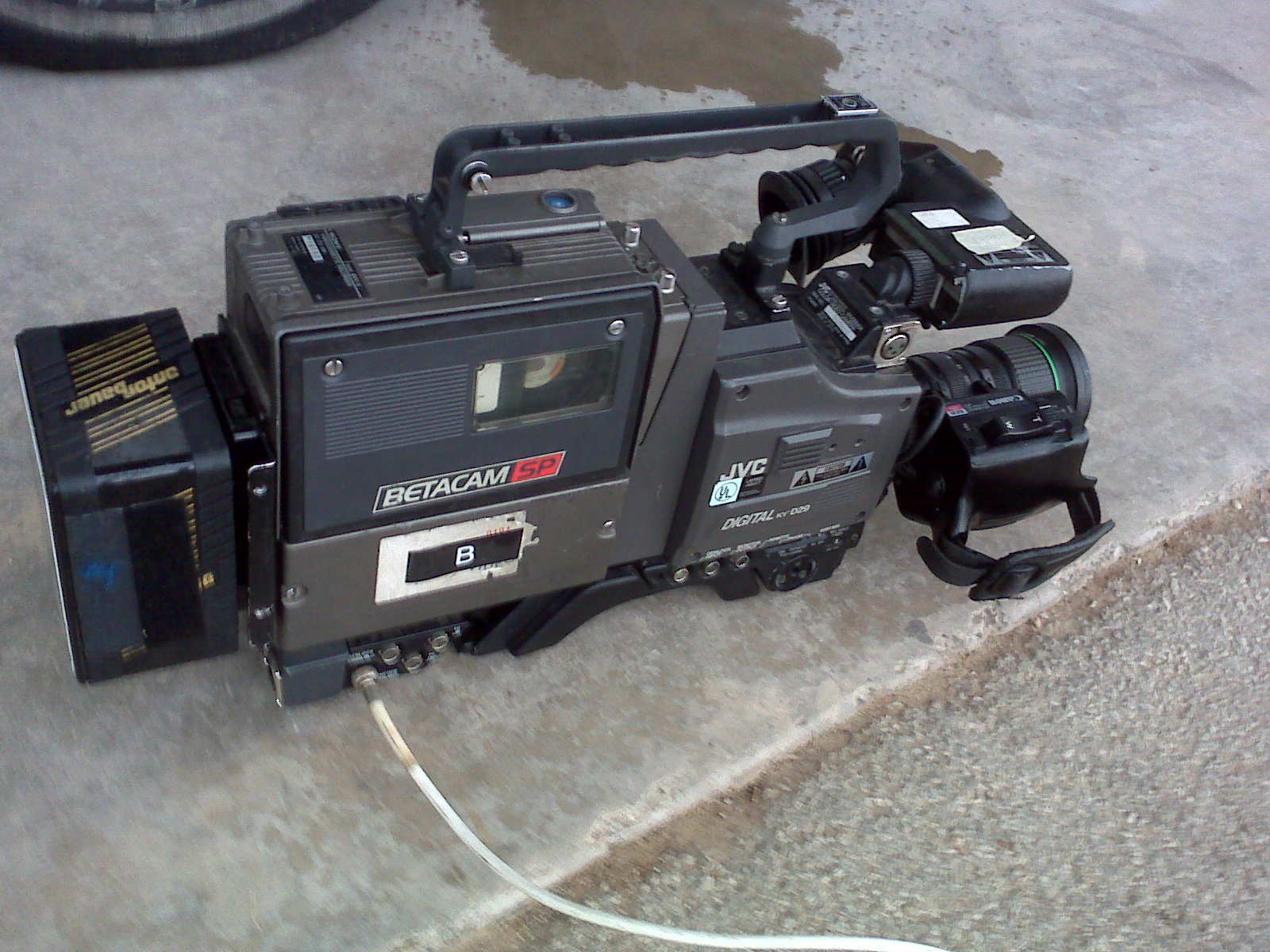
A Sony BVV-5 docked to a JVC KY-D29 camera head

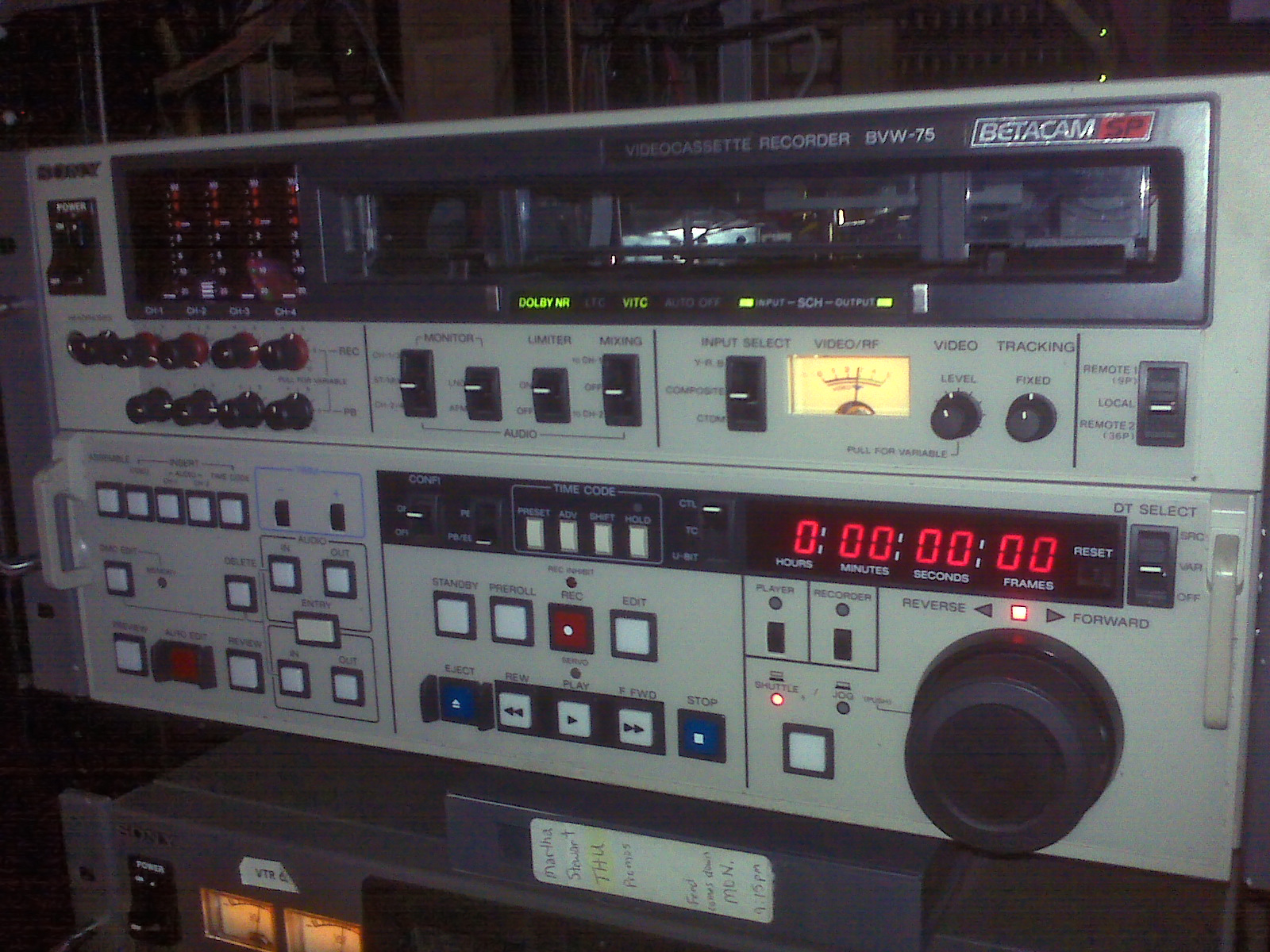
The Sony BVW-75 editing VTR

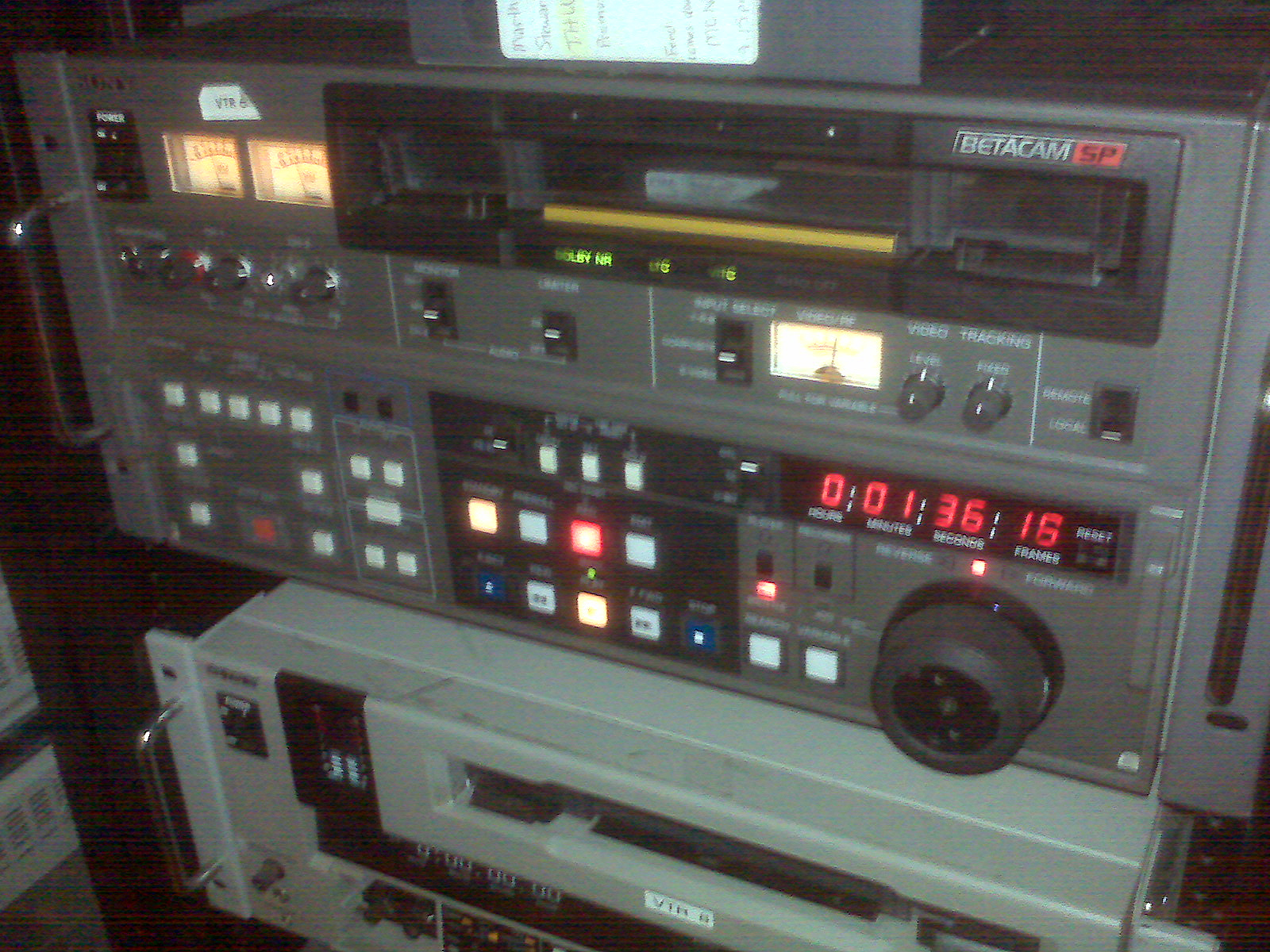
The Sony PVW-2800 editing VTR

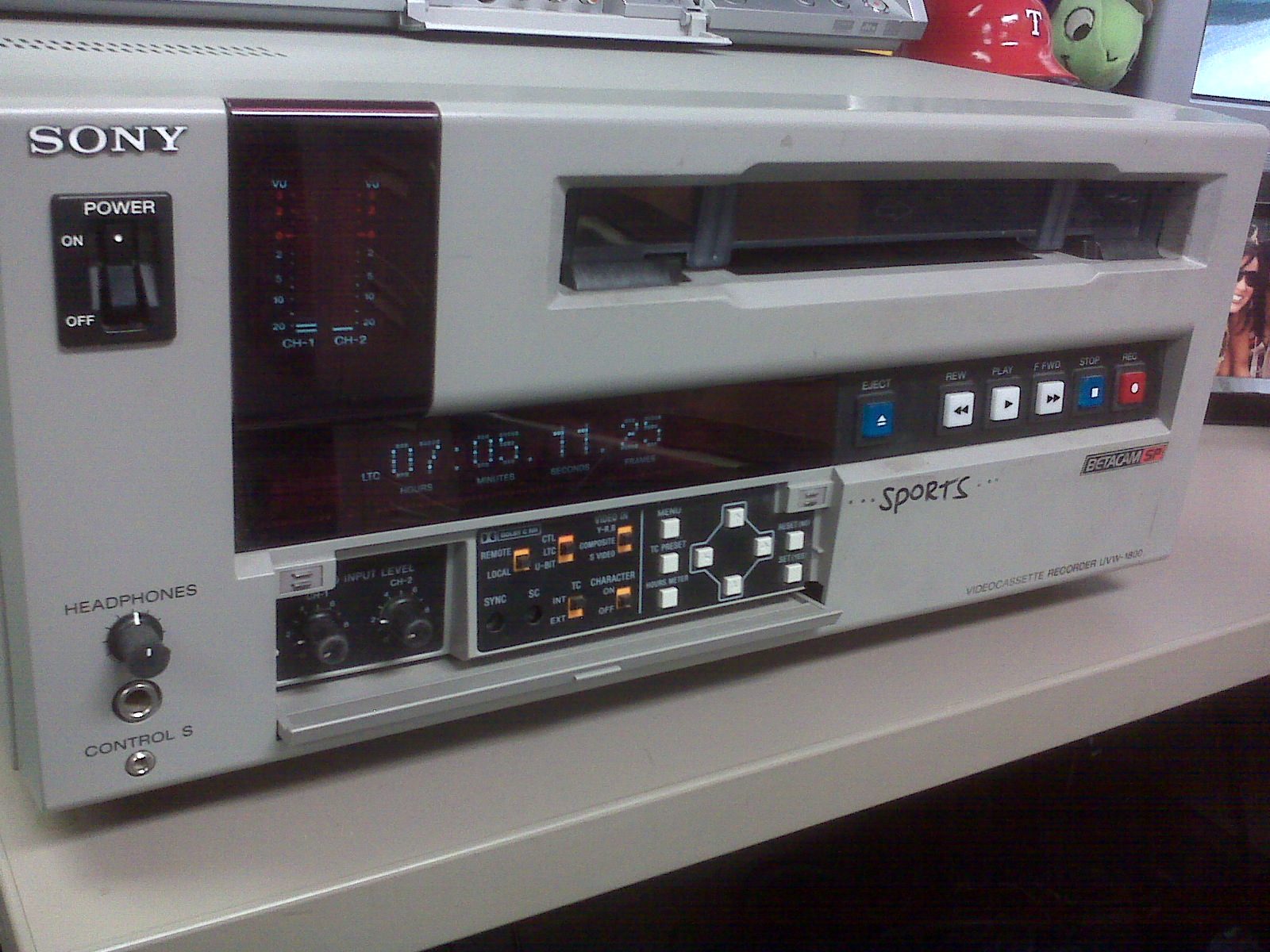
The Sony UVW-1800 editing VTR

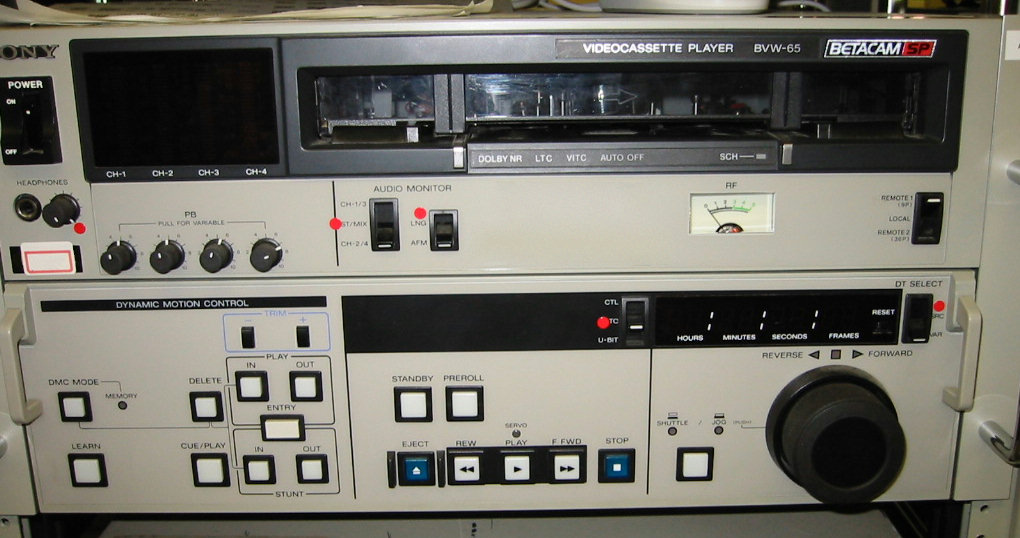
The Sony BVW-65 VTR

== Digital Betacam ==
Logo of Digital Betacam

Digital Betacam (commonly referred to as DigiBeta, D-Beta, DBC or simply Digi) was introduced at 18th International Television Symposium in Montreux on June 10, 1993. It supersedes both Betacam and Betacam SP. It cost significantly less than the D1 format, although in practice, they continued to coexist for practical and economical reasons. S tapes are available with up to 40 minutes running time, and L tapes with up to 124 minutes.

The Digital Betacam format records 2.34:1 DCT-compressed digital component video signal at 10-bit YUV 4:2:2 sampling in NTSC (720 × 486) or PAL (720 × 576) resolutions at a bitrate of 90 Mbit/s plus four channels of uncompressed 48 kHz, 20-bit PCM-encoded digital audio. A fifth analog audio track is available for cueing, and a linear timecode track is also used on the tape. It was a popular digital video cassette format for broadcast television use.

It uses a head drum 81 mm in diameter that rotates at 5400 RPM for NTSC video. The video heads in the drum read helical tracks 24 microns wide. Audio is also recorded on the helical tracks. The compression algorithm used by Digital Betacam is proprietary.

Another key element which aided adoption was Sony's implementation of the SDI coaxial digital connection on Digital Betacam decks. Facilities could begin using digital signals on their existing coaxial wiring without having to commit to an expensive re-installation.

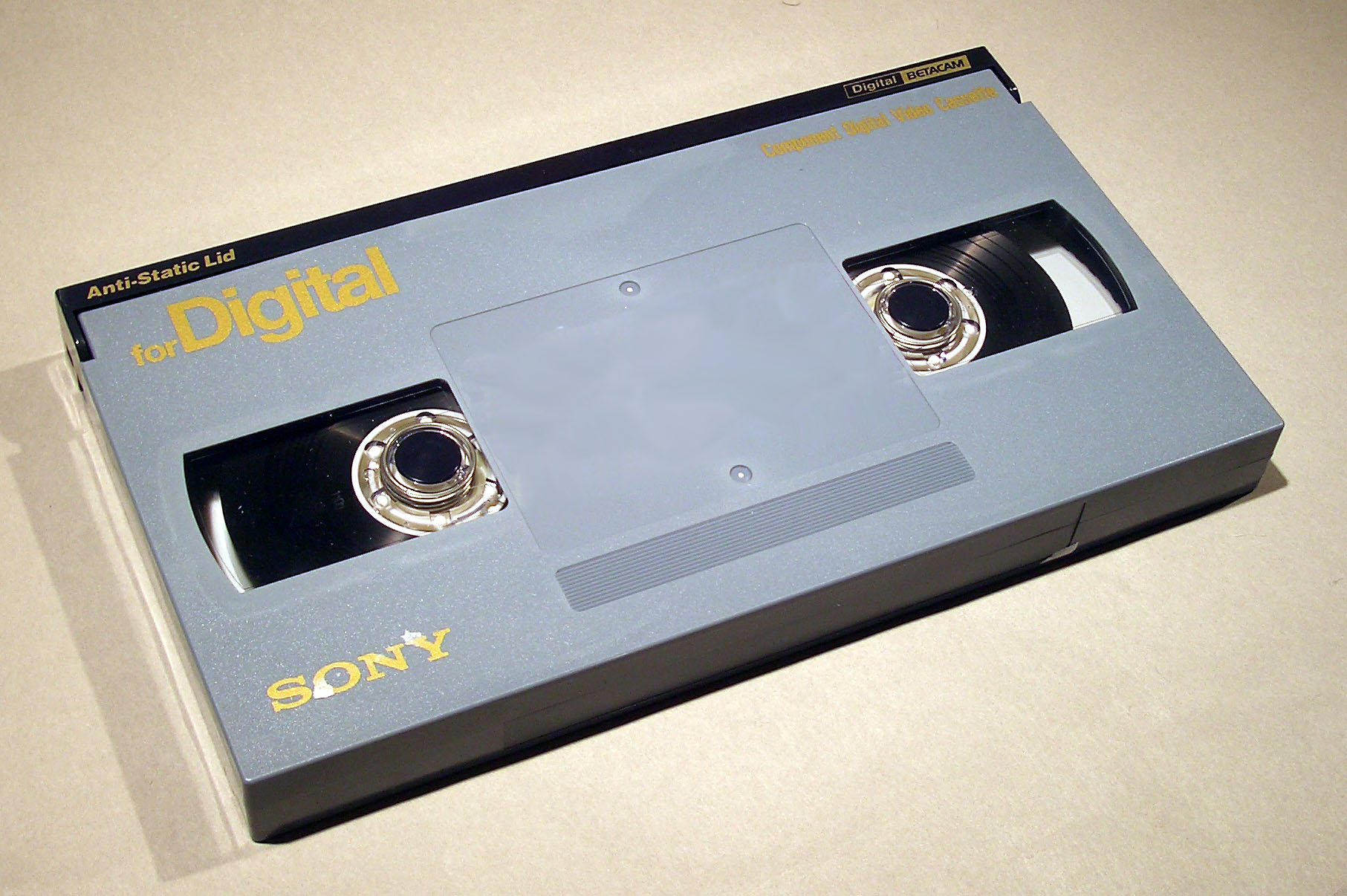
The front of a Digital Betacam L cassette

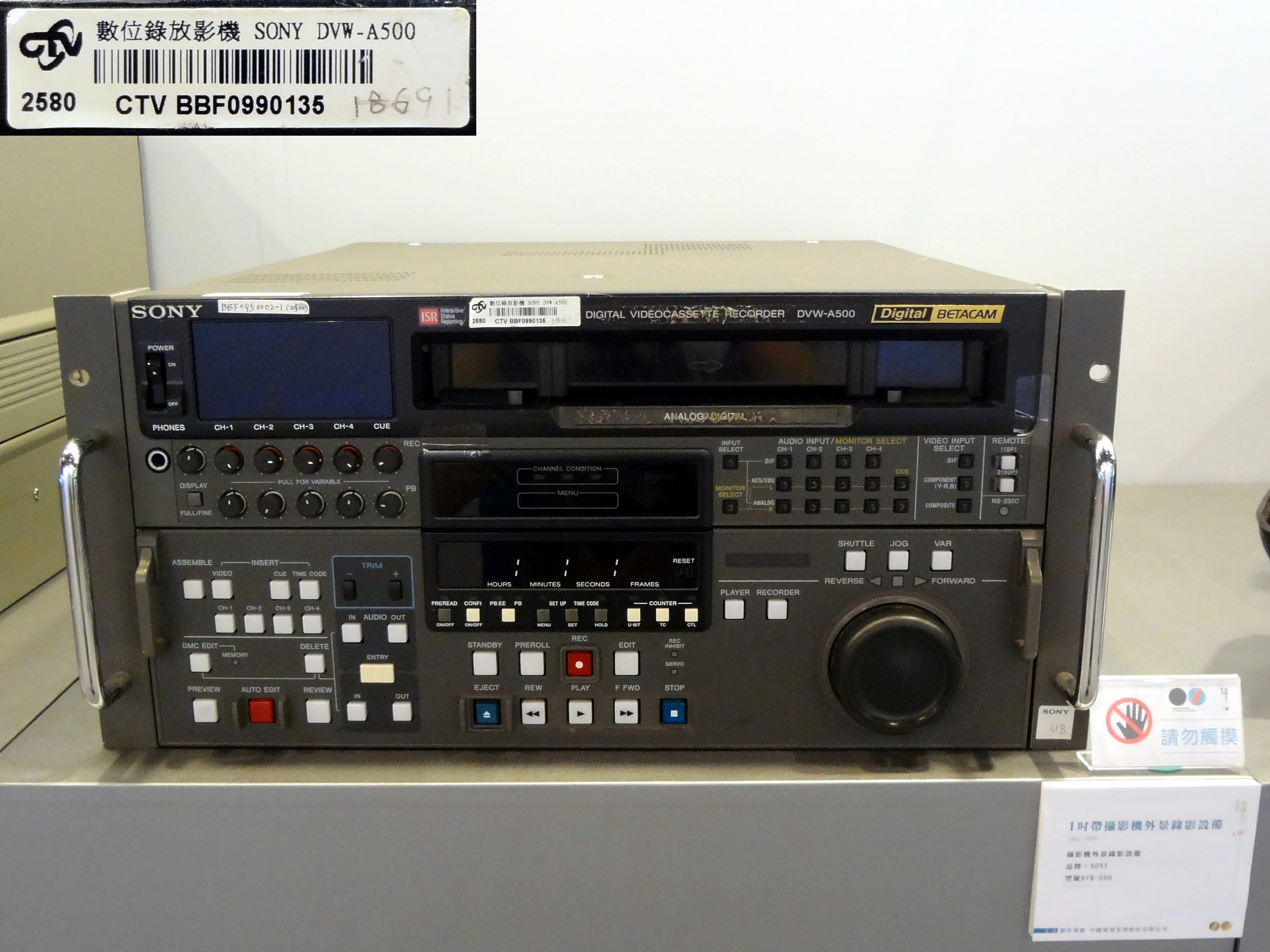
A Sony DVW-A500 editing Digital Betacam VTR

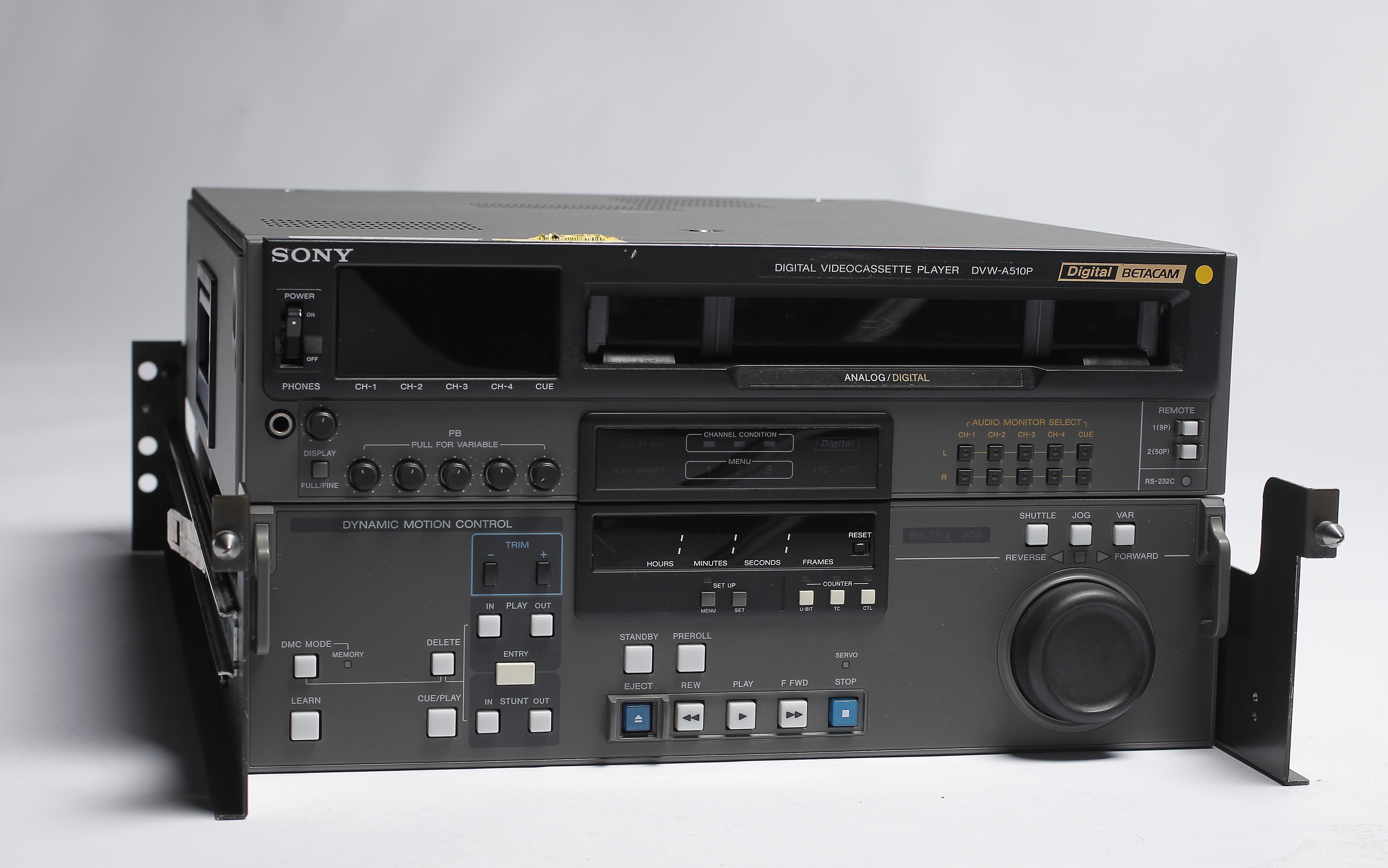
A Sony DVW-A510P playback Digital Betacam VTR

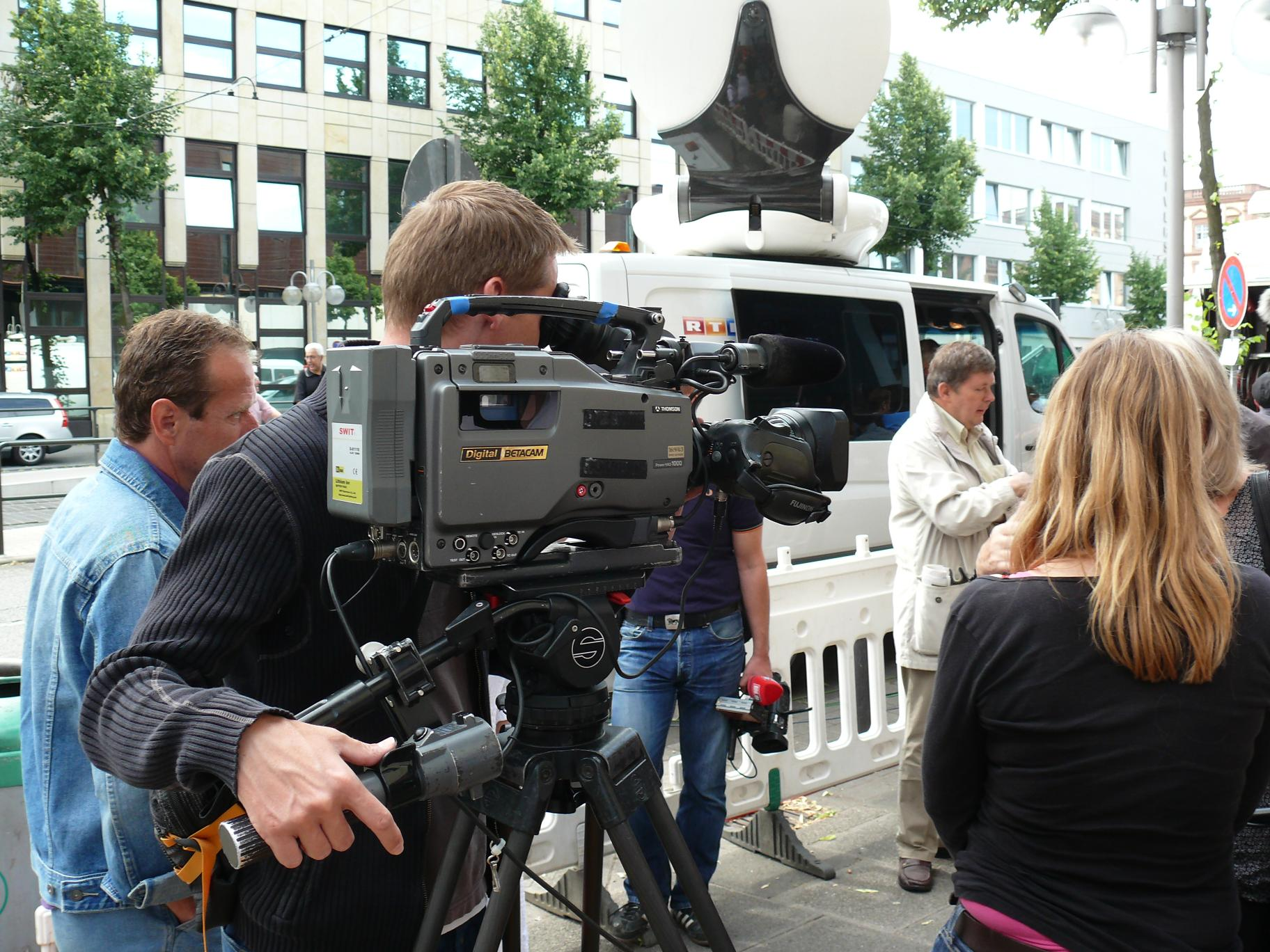
A DigiBeta camcorder in use outside

== Betacam SX ==
Logo of Betacam SX

Betacam SX is a digital version of Betacam SP introduced in 1996, positioned as a cheaper alternative to Digital Betacam. It stores video using MPEG-2 4:2:2 Profile@ML compression, along with four channels of 48 kHz, 16-bit PCM audio. All Betacam SX equipment is compatible with Betacam SP tapes. S tapes have a recording time up to 62 minutes, and L tapes up to 194 minutes.

The Betacam SX system was very successful with newsgathering operations, which had a legacy of Betacam and Betacam SP tapes. Some Betacam SX decks, such as the DNW-A75 or DNW-A50, contain both analog and digital playback heads and can natively play and work from the analog tapes.

Betacam SX uses MPEG-2 4:2:2 compression is compliant with CCIR 601, in comparison with other systems that use 4:1:1 or 4:2:0 chroma subsampling for coding. This higher subsampling gives better chroma resolution and allows certain post-production processes such as chroma key.

This format compresses the video signal from approximately 180 Mbit/s to 18 Mbit/s, a compression ratio of around 10:1, which is achieved by the use of mild temporal compression, where alternate frames are stored as MPEG I-frames and B-frames, giving rise to an IBIB sequence on tape. Due to the low bitrate, this format was not standardized by any standards body.

Together with Betacam SX, Sony introduced a generation of hybrid recorders, allowing use of both tape and disk recording on the same deck, and high-speed dubbing from one to another. This was intended to save wear on the video tape heads for television studio applications, as well as to speed up online editing.

Betacam SX also features a good shot mark feature, a method for qualitative decisions made in the camcorder to be utilized during the editing process, that allows marking of each scene for fast scanning of the tape, looking at recorded marks on each single cassette, and showing the markers to the operator.

The cameras themselves are generally considered by most sound recordists to be quite noisy in operation, possibly because the amount of computer processing power, and subsequent generated heat leads to cooling fans being used to keep the camera at a reasonable temperature.

Betacam SX tape shells are bright yellow, but SX recordings may also be found recorded on analogue Betacam SP cassettes. Of course if such a Betacam SP tape with SX recording is inserted into a Betacam SP player, no picture or sound will appear.

The helical scan head drum is 81 mm in diameter. The video tracks read by the video heads in the drum, are 32 microns wide, the drum rotates at 5400 RPM for NTSC video. The video heads have a 15.25 degree azimuth.

Although Betacam SX machines have gone out of production since 2008, the format is still used by many newsgathering operations, including Canada's CTV, Atlanta's WSB-TV, San Diego's KFMB-TV and NBC's operations in the San Francisco Bay Area at KNTV and KSTS. Many news archives still contain SX tapes. In August 2011, Betacam SX tapes were found in Muammar Gaddafi's underground studio in Tripoli. CNN reporter Sara Sidner commented on-air that CNN still used the same type of tapes.

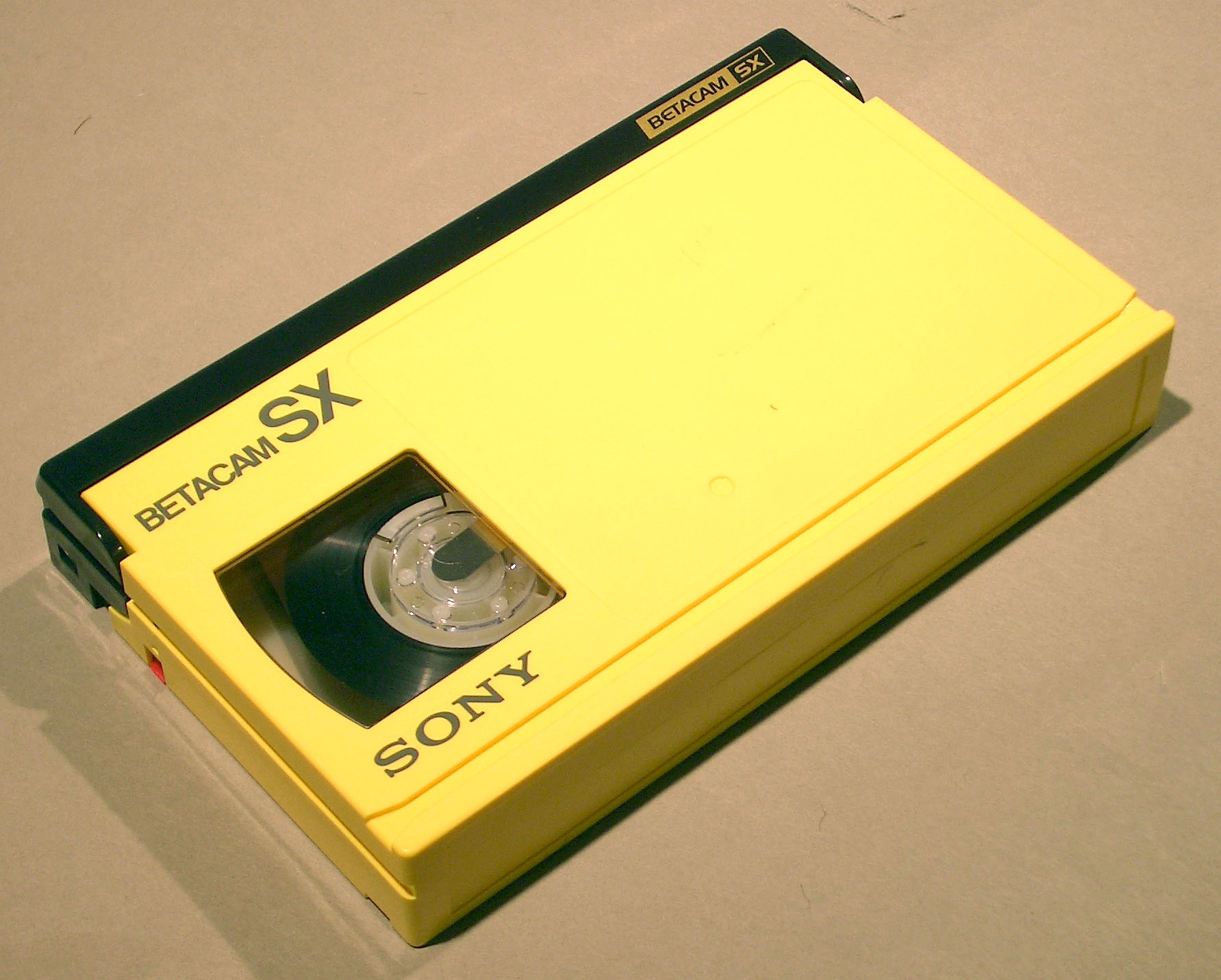
The front of a small Betacam SX cassette

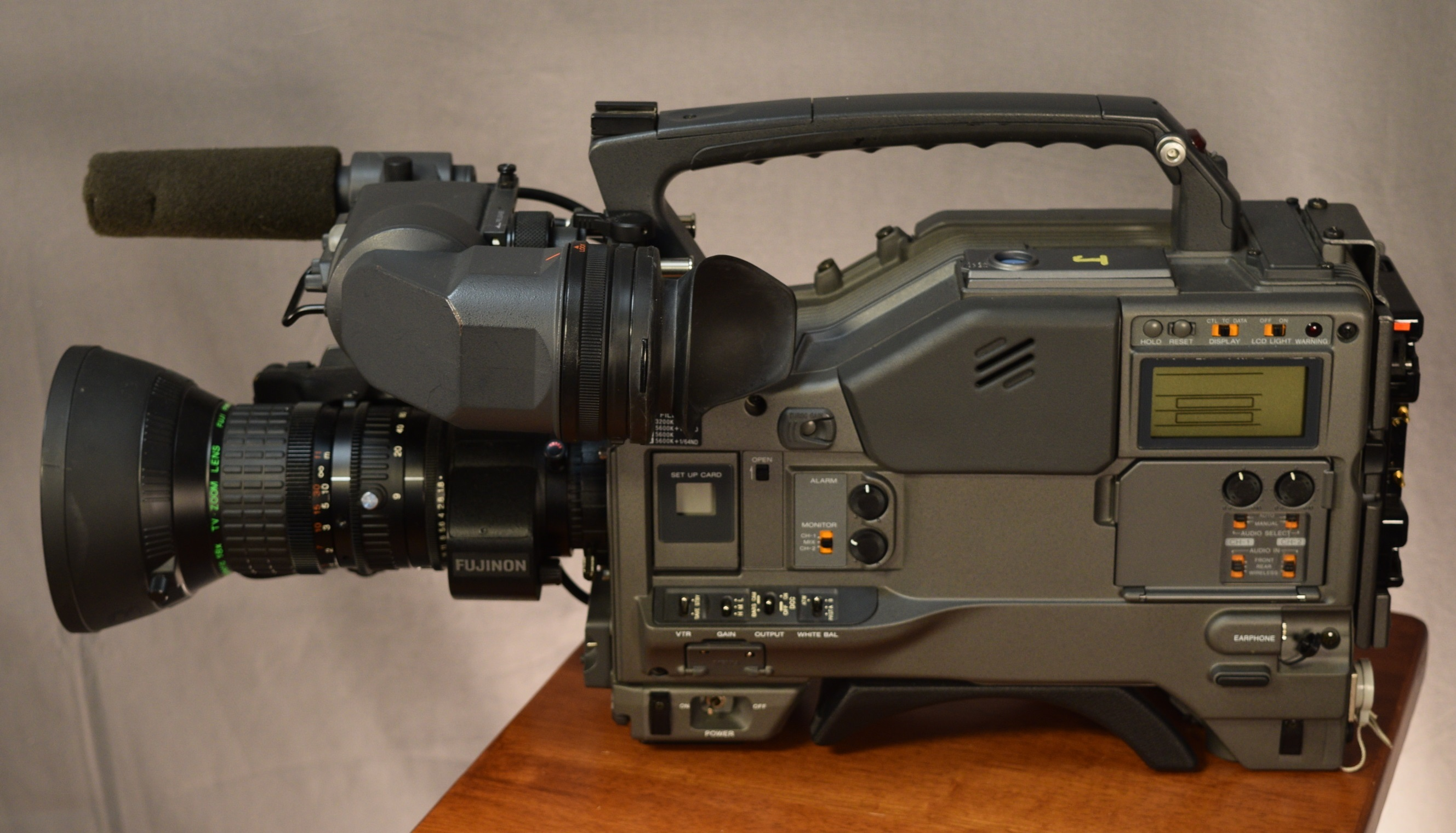
A left side view of a Betacam SX camcorder

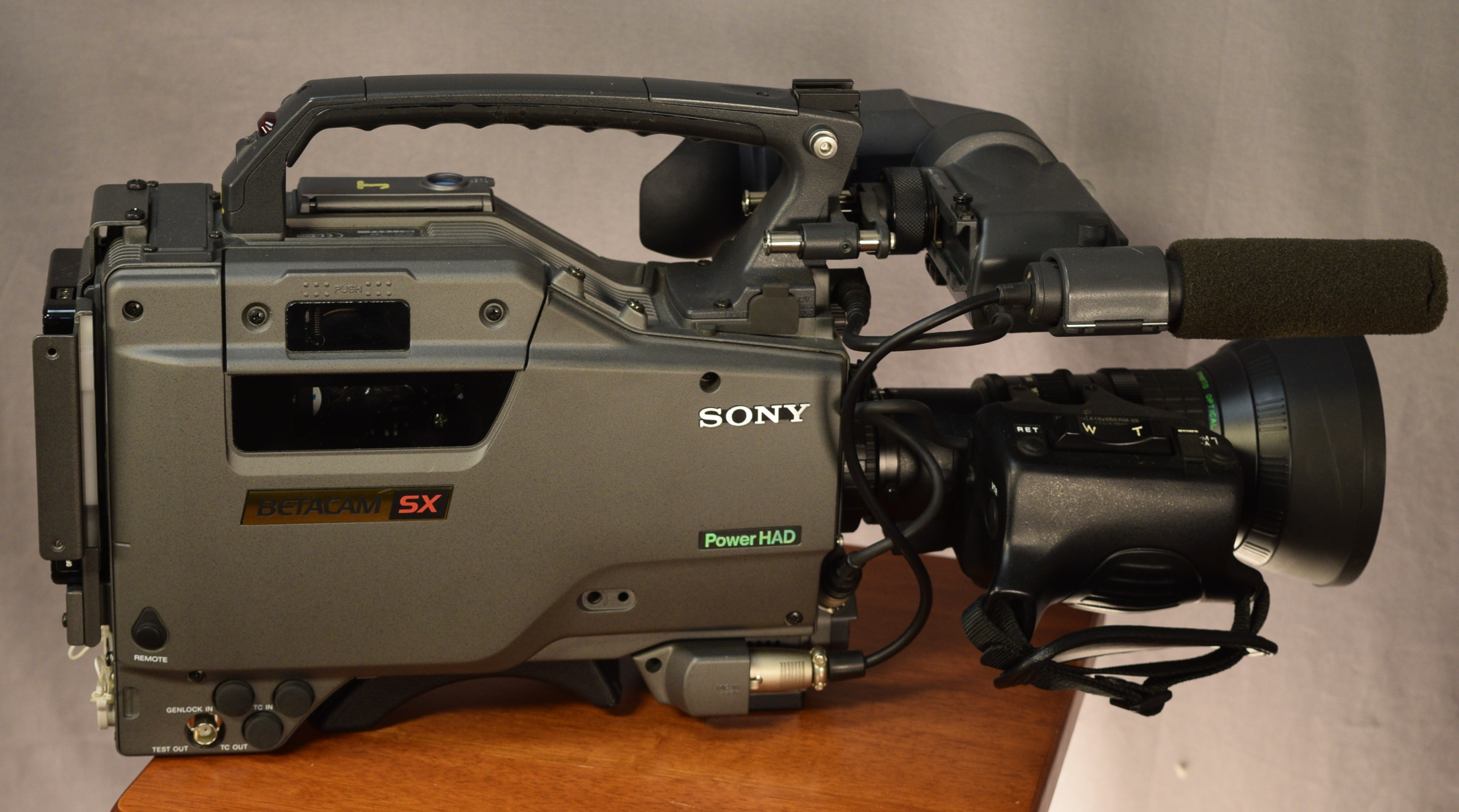
A right side view of a Betacam SX camcorder

== MPEG IMX ==
Logo of MPEG IMX

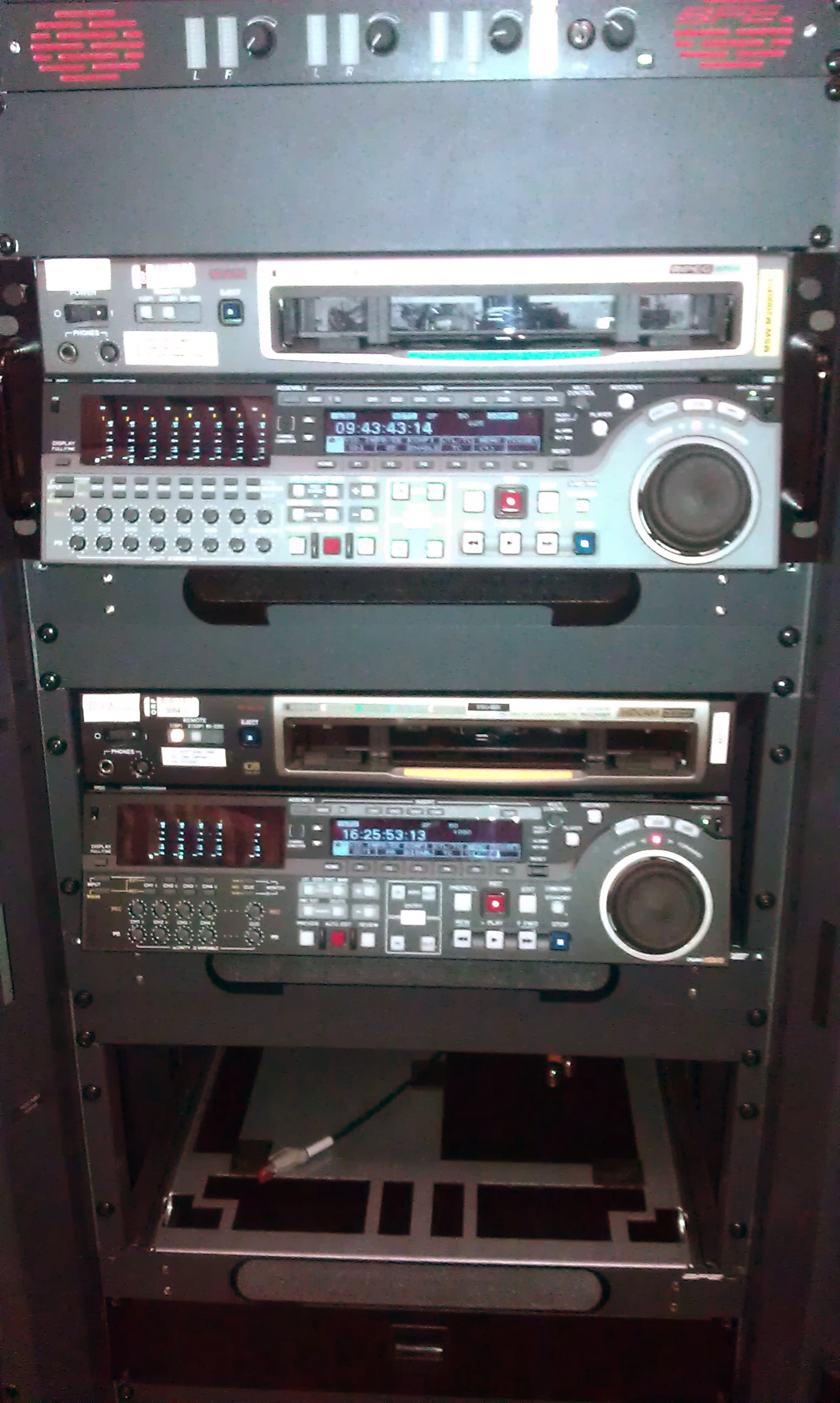
MPEG IMX deck (top) and HDCAM deck (bottom)

MPEG IMX also known as D-10, is a 2000 development of the Digital Betacam format. Digital video compression uses H.262/MPEG-2 Part 2 encoding at a higher bitrate than Betacam SX: 30 Mbit/s (6:1 compression), 40 Mbit/s (4:1 compression) or 50 Mbit/s (3.3:1 compression). Unlike most other MPEG-2 implementations, IMX uses intraframe compression. Additionally, IMX ensures that each frame has the same exact size in bytes to simplify recording onto video tape. Video recorded in the IMX format is compliant with CCIR 601 specification, with eight channels of audio and timecode track. It lacks an analog audio (cue) track as the Digital Betacam, but will read it as channel 7 if used for playback. This format has been standardized in SMPTE 365M and SMPTE 356M as "MPEG D10 Streaming".

With its IMX VTRs, Sony introduced some new technologies including SDTI and e-VTR. SDTI allows for audio, video, timecode, and remote control functions to be transported by a single coaxial cable, while e-VTR technology extends this by allowing the same data to be transported over IP by way of an Ethernet interface on the VTR itself.

All IMX VTRs can natively playback Betacam SX tapes, and some, such as the MSW-M2000P/1 are capable of playing back Digital Betacam cassettes as well as analog Betacam and Betacam SP cassettes, but they can only record to their native IMX cassettes. S tapes are available with up to 60 minutes capacity, and L tapes hold up to 184 minutes. These values are for 525/60 decks, but will extend in 625/50. A 184-minute tape will record for, as the label itself specifies, 220 minutes.

IMX machines feature the same good shot mark function of the Betacam SX.

MPEG IMX cassettes are a muted green.

This format uses a helical scan head drum 80 mm in diameter. The video tracks read by the video heads in the drum, are 22 microns wide. The video heads have a 15.25 degree azimuth. 4:2:2 Chroma subsampling is used, and the drum rotates at 5400 RPM for NTSC video. Due to the use of an MPEG format, video is recorded with 8-bit samples (8-bit color).

The XDCAM format, unveiled in 2003, allows recording of MPEG IMX video in MXF container onto Professional Disc.

== HDCAM/HDCAM SR ==
HDCAM, introduced in 1997, was the first HD format available in Betacam form-factor, using an 8-bit DCT compressed 3:1:1 recording, in 1080i-compatible downsampled resolution of 1440×1080, and adding 24p and 23.976 PsF modes to later models. The HDCAM codec uses non-square pixels and as such the recorded 1440×1080 content is upsampled to 1920×1080 on playback. The recorded video bitrate is 144 Mbit/s. There are four channels of AES/EBU 20-bit/48 kHz digital audio.

It was used for some of Sony's cinema-targeted CineAlta range of products (newer CineAlta devices use flash storage).

HDCAM SR, introduced in 2003, uses a higher particle density tape and is capable of recording in 10 bits 4:2:2 or 4:4:4 RGB with a bitrate of 440 Mbit/s. The "SR" stands for "Superior Resolution". The increased bitrate (over HDCAM) allows HDCAM SR to capture much more of the full bandwidth of the HD-SDI signal (1920×1080). Some HDCAM SR VTRs can also use a 2× mode with an even higher bitrate of 880 Mbit/s, allowing for a 4:4:4 RGB stream at a lower compression. HDCAM SR uses the new MPEG-4 Part 2 Studio Profile for compression, and expands the number of audio channels up to 12 at 48 kHz/24 bit.

HDCAM SR was used commonly for HDTV television production.

Some HDCAM VTRs play back older Betacam variants, for example, the Sony SRW-5500 HDCAM SR recorder, plays back and records HDCAM and HDCAM SR tapes and with optional hardware also plays and upconverts Digital Betacam tapes to HD format. Tape lengths are the same as for Digital Betacam, up to 40 minutes for S and 124 minutes for L tapes. In 24p mode the runtime increases to 50 and 155 minutes, respectively.

Sony branded HDCAM cassettes are black with an orange lid, and HDCAM SR cassettes black with a cyan lid.

440 Mbit/s mode is known as SQ, and 880 Mbit/s mode is known as HQ, and this mode has recently become available in studio models (e.g. SRW-5800) as well as portable models previously available.

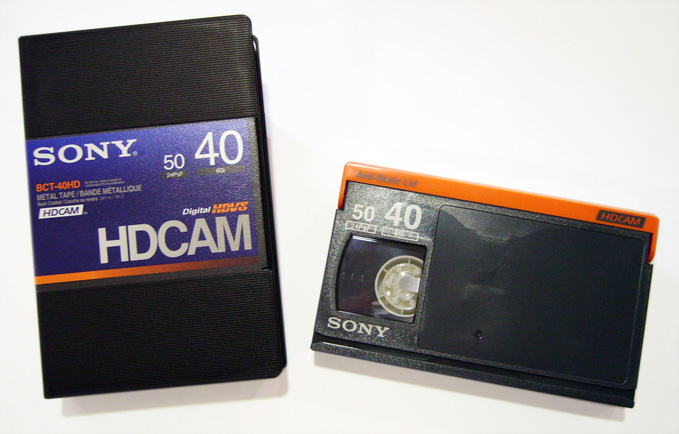
An HDCAM small cassette

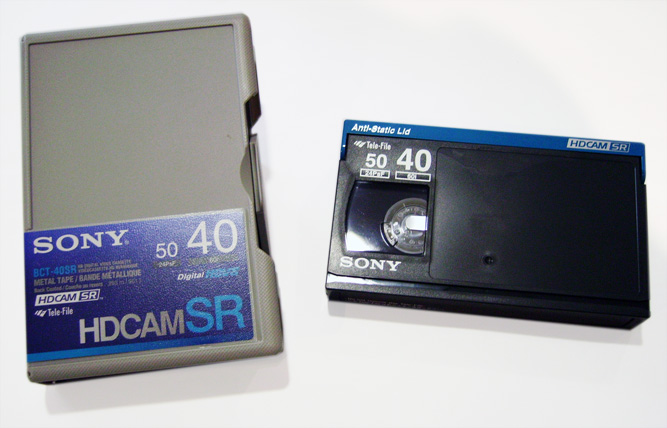
An HDCAM SR small cassette

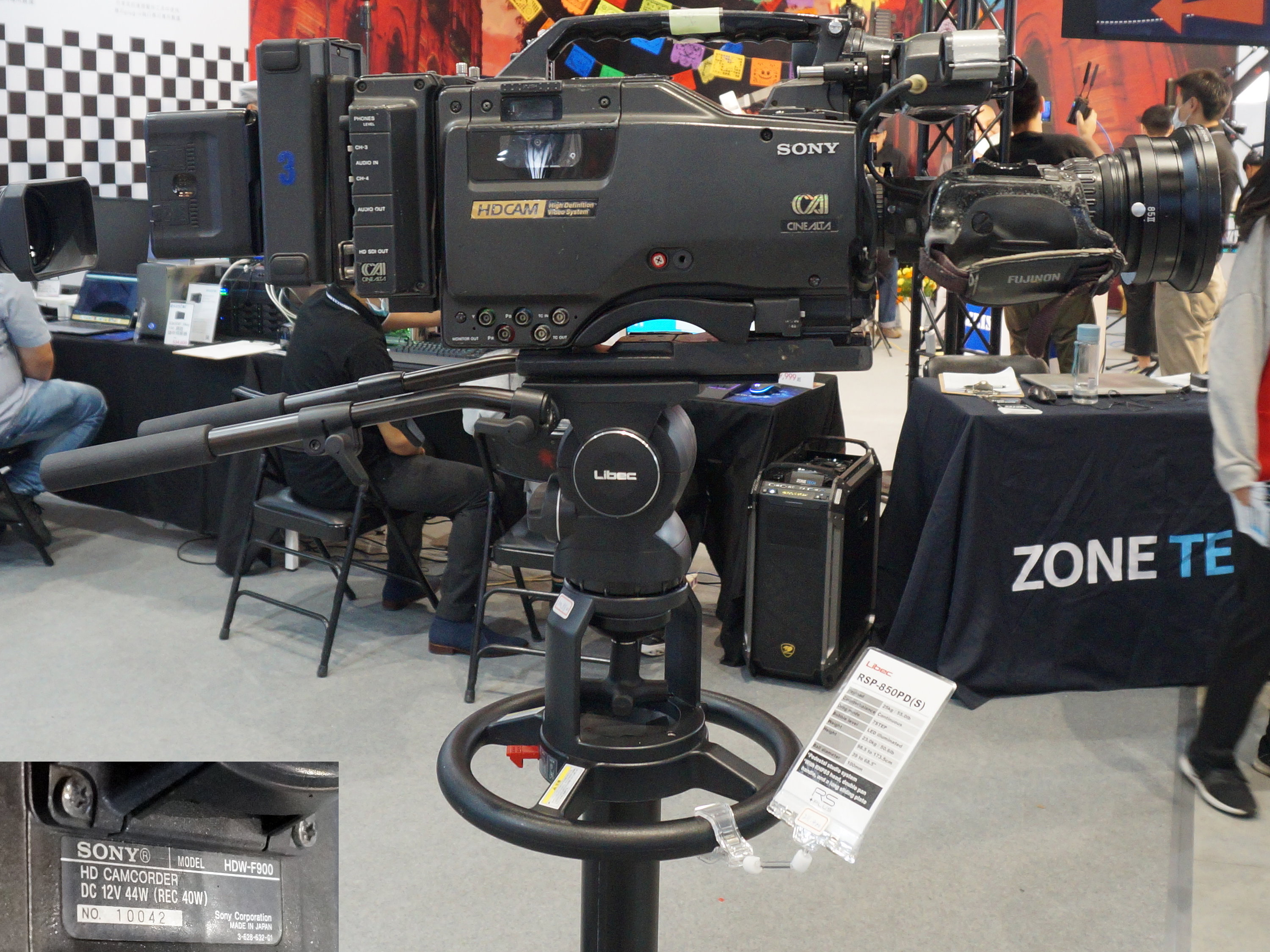
A Sony HDW-F900 CineAlta HDCAM camcorder

== See also ==
- M (videocassette format)
- MII (videocassette format)
