= Channel 3 (Thailand) =

Television channel founded in 1970

- Logo used since 26 March 2020
- Country: Thailand
- Headquarters: Maleenont Tower, Khlong Toei, Bangkok, Thailand

Programming
- Language: Thai
- Picture format: 1080i HDTV

Ownership
- Owner: BEC World

History
- Launched: 26 March 1970

Links
- Website: www.ch3plus.com

Availability

Terrestrial
- Digital: Channel 33 (HD) (TPBS MUX4)

Streaming media
- 3Plus

Channel 3
- Channels: Analog: VHF 2 (26 March 1970 - 1977, as a black and white 525-line relayer) VHF 3 (26 March 1970 - 1 July 2007) UHF 32 (26 March 2005 - 25 March 2020); Digital: 44 (shared on MUX#4: TPBS); Virtual: 33

History
- Former call signs: HST-TV; HS-TV3

Channel 3 (Thai: ช่อง 3, romanized: Chong 3; Thai: สถานีโทรทัศน์ไทยทีวีสีช่อง 3, romanized: Sathani Thorathat Thai Thiwisi Chong 3, lit. 'Thai Television Color Channel 3') is a Thai commercial free-to-air television network that was launched on 26 March 1970 as Thailand's second commercial TV station. Channel 3 is operated by BEC Multimedia Company Limited (BECM), a subsidiary of the media conglomerate BEC World. The network is headquartered in the Maleenont Tower in Bangkok. Its slogan is "คุ้มค่าทุกนาที ดูทีวีสีช่อง 3, Khum Kha Thuk Nathi Du Thiwi Si Chong 3" ("Worth every minute, watch color television Channel 3").

== History ==
Bangkok Entertainment Co., Ltd. was founded on 10 November 1967 by the Maleenont family to join hands with government agencies in operating a 625-line color TV station under a joint investment agreement submitted for the establishment of the TV station on 3 December 1967, and entered into an agreement with Thai Television Co., Ltd. (now MCOT) on 4 March 1968. In early 1969, the groundbreaking ceremony of its facilities was held at Nong Khaem district of Bangkok alongside a training program given to Japanese staff. Following this, a CCIR PAL 625-line transmitter was constructed. By March 1970, the budget of the network was of 75 million baht.

Channel 3 made its first off-air tests on 16 February 1970 with the first recorded program; the first test broadcasts were conducted on 11 March for two hours between 19:00 and 21:00. Four days later a longer test transmission was held from 9:30 to 23:55. The channel was officially launched in Bangkok as Thailand's second commercial television channel on 26 March 1970 at 10:00 Bangkok Time by Prime Minister Field Marshal Thanom Kittikachorn and is the fourth oldest television station in the country. The channel's broadcast area was limited to the Bangkok Metropolitan Area (Bangkok and the surrounding areas) at the time. With the dissolution of the Thai Television Company and the creation of MCOT, MCOT became responsible for Channel 3's transmission, with BEC being the operator.

On 16 July 1987, it established a joint broadcasting equipment agreement with Channel 9 to expand the signal of Channel 3 to a national scale by 1992. With this contract, the license was now renewed from 1990, for a period of 30 years. The expansion project took place between 1988 and 1989 and was carried out in phases.

During its early years, Channel 3's airtime lasted six hours, broadcasting from 16:00 to 22:00, and later expanded to the daytime hours. For a short period of time, it started broadcasting 24 hours from March to August 1997, but was scuttled due to the 1997 Asian financial crisis. The network resumed its 24-hour airtime on 1 January 2005.

On 1 January 2001, Channel 3 was the first station in Thailand to broadcast a 3D film. The movie, Jaws 3-D, required a pair of 3D glasses bought from certain stores partnered with the network for the event or obtained elsewhere.

In the late 2000s, the channel's philosophy was the development of the quality of all types of programs in order to bring more variety to the viewer.

On 16 September 2009, due to a wastewater treatment failure, the generator room was flooded, leading to all broadcasts to be suspended at approximately 4:04pm due to the lack of power. At 5:32pm, a test card was shown with the National Anthem, and at 5:37pm, programs returned.

In September 2018, Channel 3 (owned jointly by BEC and MCOT) was the last broadcaster to broadcast analog television services in Thailand. The network made the move to digital television in late 2019 on VHF while analogue television ceased transmission on 26 March 2020 at 00:00 am (UTC+7), exactly 50 years after the channel's launch. This also marked the end of MCOT's contract, as it stated that all analog broadcasting equipment must be returned to them.

In 2021, all entertainment programs produced by Tero Entertainment were transferred to Channel 7 HD.

=== Airing hours ===
Currently the channel broadcasts 24 hours a day.

- 1970–1980s
  - Channel 3 broadcasts for six hours daily, 18:00–24:00.
- 1980s–1990
  - Channel 3 broadcasts for eight hours daily Monday to Friday, 16:00–24:00. (For sightteen hours daily Saturday Sunday and Weekend, 08:00-24:00)
- 1990–1992
  - Channel 3 broadcasts for 10 hours daily, 14:00–24:00.
- Summer 1992
  - Channel 3 broadcasts for 12 hours daily, 12:00–24:00.
- the end of Summer-September 1992
  - Channel 3 broadcasts for 13 hours daily, 11:00–24:00.
- Winter 1992–1993
  - Channel 3 broadcasts for 15 hours daily, 09:00–24:00.
- 1993–1994
  - Channel 3 broadcasts for 18 hours daily, 06:00–24:00.
- 1994–1997, 1997-2000s
  - Channel 3 broadcasts for 18 and half hours daily, 05:30–24:00.
- 2000s-2004
  - Channel 3 broadcasts for 21 hours daily, 05:00–02:00.
- 1997, 2005–2010
  - Channel 3 broadcasts for 21 hours 30 minutes daily, 04:00-01:30
