= List of Sony trademarks =

The following are or were trademarks of the Sony Group Corporation or its subsidiaries:

== 0–9 ==
- 3 MAX+
- 700 Series
- 3net
- 12 TONE ANALYSIS

== Apps ==
- Sony Corporation (apps)
- Sony Group Corporation (apps)
- Sony Mobile Communications Inc., (apps)
- Sony Mobile Communications (apps)
- Sony Mobile Communications AB (apps)
- Sony Network Communications (apps)
- Sony Network Communications Inc. (apps)
- Sony Network Communications Europe '''B.V.''' (apps)
- PlayStation Mobile Inc. (apps)
- Sony Music Entertainment (apps)
- Sony Music Communications Inc. (apps)
- Sony Music Entertainment(Japan)Inc. (apps)
- Sony Music Publishing (US) LLC (apps)
- Sony Music Solutions Inc. (apps)
- Sony Music Entertainment Germany GmbH (apps)
- Crunchyroll, LLC (apps)
- Sony Marketing Inc. (apps)
- Sony (China) Limited (apps)
- ソニー損害保険株式会社［ソニー損保］ (apps)
- Sony Business Solutions Corporation (apps)
- Sony Pictures (apps)
- Sony Pictures Home Entertainment (apps)
- Sony Pictures Television UK Rights Limited (apps)
- Sony Pictures Television (apps)
- Sony Global Education, Inc. (apps)
- SONY INSTITUTE OF HIGHER EDUCATION (apps)
- Sony Electronics Inc. (apps)
- Sony Europe '''B.V.''' (apps)
- Sony Network Communications Inc. (apps)
- Sony Pictures Entertainment Iberia (apps)
- Sony Semiconductor Solutions Corp. (apps)
- Sony Middle East and Africa FZE (apps)
- Sony Media Cloud Services LLC (apps)
- Sony Vietnam (apps)
- Sony Pictures Spain (apps)
- Sony Pictures Entertainment DMG (apps)
- Sony Pictures Networks India Pvt. Ltd (apps)

== A ==
- A Vision For Business
- a2DVD
- ACAMS
- Access Center
- AccuPower
- Accurate Image Restoration
- Active Prism
- Advanced HAD
- Advanced Intelligent Tape (word & logo)
- Advanced Storage by Sony
- Afeela
- AIBO
- Sony α (Alpha DSLR)
- Aiwa
- AIR
- Air-Egg
- AirTrac
- Airpeak
- America's Digital Yearbook
- APOS
- ASC
- ATRAC
- ATRAC3
- Audio Very Important Professional Club
- Audio VIP Club
- Auto Access
- Auto Clock Reveal
- Auto Dialer
- Auto ImageSet
- Auto Shutter
- AutoAlert
- AutoCenter and Size
- Automatic Music Sensor (AMS)
- AV Laser

== B ==
- BabyCall
- Backglow
- Because There's So Much More to Hear
- Beta Hi-Fi
- Beta/Plex
- Betacam
- Betacam SP
- Betacam SX
- Betacart
- Betamax
- Betamovie
- BetaScan
- BetaScanII
- BetaSkipScan
- Bicro-Beam
- Bidirex
- BiERA
- BIONZ
- Bitcorder
- Bloggie (camcorder)
- Blue ICS
- Blu-code
- Blu-ray Disc
  - Blu-ray 3D
  - Ultra HD Blu-ray
- BoxEdit
- BRAVIA
- Brilliant Color and Sound

== C ==
- Cable Mouse
- Cappra
- Carbonmirror
- Carrier Gate
- Cassette-corder
- CCD Iris
- CCD Protection Plan
- CD Complete
- CD Complete Pro
- CD Ease
- CD Extreme
- CD-Text
- CD-IT
- CD-IT Pro
- CD-ROM (key-shaped logo)
- CD-ROM Discman
- Cdit
- CDit Pro
- Cell
- Century Media
- Cerasin Chassis
- Change the Way You Hear the World
- Change The Way You Remember The World
- Change the Way You See the World
- Channel Magic
- Childloc
- Choose Your Definition
- CineAlta
- Cinema 8
- CineMotion
- Cinenet
- Cineza
- Clear Scan
- Clear Scan 25
- Clear Voice
- ClearScan
- ClearScan 25
- Click to DVD
- CLIÉ
- Clip Motion
- ClipEdit
- Cliplink
- ClipMaster
- ClipServer
- Color Pure Filter
- Commercial Pass
- Compact Series
- Compact disc (logo)
- Completing the Picture
- Conductor
- Confer-Corder
- Connect & Create
- Converting The Industry Bit By Bit
- Corporate Audio
- CRVdisc
- Custom File
- Custom Index
- CV-2000
- Cyber-shot
- Cyber-shot Pro
- Cycle Energy
- Cyberframe

== D ==
- D-WAVE
- D-WAVE Cosm
- D-WAVE Zuma
- Dash (personal internet viewer)
- D8
- D8 (logo)
- DASH (logo)
- Data Discman
- Data Media (logo)
- Datstation
- DD230
- DDE
- DDL
- DAT
- DDS/Digital Data Storage (logo)
- DDS2/Digital Data Storage (logo)
- DDS3/Digital Data Storage (logo)
- DDS4/Digital Data Storage (logo)
- Defining the Digital Future
- Desktop Library
- Dexerials
- DG5CL
- Digital Betacam (logo)
- Digital Cinema Sound
- Digital Dream
- Digital Dream Kids
- Digital Dynamic Convergence
- Digital FlexRes
- Digital Gate
- Digital Link
- Digital Message Shuttle
- Digital Monitor Series
- Digital Network Recorder
- Digital PCLink (logo)
- Digital Reality Creation
- Digital Relay
- Digital Signal Transfer
- Digital Sketch
- Digital Sparkle
- Digital Sync
- Digital With Soul
- Digital. Powerful. Transportable.
- Digital8
- Direct access
- Direct Digital Link
- Direct Digital Stream
- Direct Stream Digital
- Direct Tuning
- Disc Explorer
- Disc Memo
- Disc2Phone
- Discam
- DiscJockey
- Discman
- Disk B-Roll
- Display Mouse
- Displays by Sony
- Disturb the Peace
- DJ Bank
- DME Link
- DNAS
- Donpisha
- DRC
- Dream Machine (a line of clock radios, also the development codename for the PlayStation)
- DreamLink
- Drive My Imagination
- DSD
- DSEE
- DSP Axis
- DST
- DT
- DTF
- DTF (logo)
- dtv-Ready
- dtv-Ready (logo)
- Dual Adjust Head
- Dual Axis
- Dual Discrete
- Dual Room Link Control
- DualShock (series of PlayStation controllers)
- DVCam
- DVD
- DVD-Video
- DVD Dream
- DVD Navigator
- DVD Style
- DVgate
- DV Direct
- DynaFit
- Dynalatitude
- Dynamic Color
- Dynamic Focus
- Dynamic Picture
- Dynamic Receiver
- Dynamic Tracking
- Dynamicron

== E ==
- e-conference (logo)
- E-FILE
- Easy Activation
- EasySearch
- Eco Info (logo)
- ED Beta
- Edit Monitor
- Edit Search
- EditStation
- Elliptical Correction System
- eMarker
- Enhanced Elliptical Correction System
- Ergo-Angle
- ESP
- ESP MAX
- Evaticle
- eVilla
- Exmor
- Express Commander
- Express Navigator
- Express Support
- Express Tuning
- Extralloy
- Extreme Editing
- Exwave HAD
- EZ AUDIO
- EZ Editor
- EZ Flip Commander
- EZ Memories
- EZ-Flip
- Ezfit
- EAT SLEEP PLAY

== F ==
- FastPort
- FD Trinitron/WEGA (logo)
- FeliCa Networks
- Flash Recording System
- Flat Out Better
- Flexicart
- Flexsys
- Flexys
- Flying Erase
- Fontopia
- Forget to Set
- Forget-to-Set
- Fulfil
- Full Color Sound
- Fun & Games
- FunMail
- Fyla

== G ==
- G Chassis
- G-Chassis
- G-Sense
- G-Protection
- G-Station
- Game Sync
- Game Xpand
- GeoLock Plus
- Get It Backwards
- Giga Pocket
- GIGAMO
- Glasstron
- Gold Plug
- GoldPlus
- Grand Wega: a LCD projector television system using a patented "optical engine" to provide a large image in a compact chassis. Screen sizes in inches as of 2004 can range anywhere for 42" to 70", composed of approximately 2.5 million plus pixels.
- Graphic Picture Enhancement
- Great Products Great People
- Gracenote
- GVIF

== H ==
- H.EAR
- Handshake design
- Handycam
- Handycam Pro
- Handycam Vision
- Hawkeye Innovation
- HDCAM
- HDTV (logo)
- HDNA
- HDVS
- HDV
- HDVS (logo)
- HF High Fidelity
- Hi Band
- Hi-Band
- Hi-eye Q
- Hi-Packing
- Hi-Scan
- Hi-Scan 1080I
- Hi8
- Hi8 Editor
- HiDensity
- High Density Linear
- High Density Linear Converter
- HMZ-T1
- Home Entertainment Universe
- Home-Jet
- Hyper HAD
- Hyper Metal
- HZDM

== I ==
- I-Link
- i.LINK
- IC Recorder
- ID Telephone
- IE / Ion Energy (logo)
- ImageStation
- Imaging Edge Webcam (logo)
- Indextron
- InfoLithium
- Infostick
- Innovation At Work
- Integrated System Commander
- Intelligent Dialer
- Intellilight
- Intellitape
- Inzone
- Sony Ipela
- Isara
- It's A Sony "S"
- It's As Easy As A Floppy
- Izziton

== J ==
- Jfutura
- JJTRON
- Jog dial
- JumboTron
- JumboWall

== K ==
- Kazé
- Kando Trip
  - Kando Experience Program

== L ==
- LanBacker
- LANC (logo)
- LaserLink
- Lasermax
- Leading The Way
- Learn From the Leaders
- Legato Linear
- Life Just Got Better
- Light Sensor
- Lightsensor
- LinkBuds
  - LinkBuds S
- Lissa
- Luma Professional LCD Monitor
- Liv
- Live in Your World, Play In Ours
- Lyrics Display
- LocationFree
- Lumisponder

== M ==
- Macro Storage Through Patented Micro Technology
- MacView
- Magic Link
- MagicGate
- Make the Internet Yours
- Making Business Pleasure
- Marine Pack
- Matrix Sound
- Matrix Surround
- Mavica
- Mavicap
- Mavicard
- Mavigraph
- Mavipak
- Max-8
- Maxxum
- Maximum Television
- Maximum TV
- MD Link (logo)
- MD Link Plus
- MD View
- MD Walkman
- MD Walkman (logo)
- MDLP
- MDP Muli Disc Player
- Media Bar
- Media Communicator
- Media Forum
- Media Mover
- Media Park
- Media Window
- Mega Bass
- Mega Bass Port
- Mega Storage
- Mega Watchman
- MegaStorage
- Memory Match Ringing
- Memory Stick
- Memory Stick Micro M2
- Memory Stick Pro Duo
- Memory Stick Duo
- Memory Stick Pro-HG
- Menu Disc
- MenuNav
- Messenger Card
- Metal Select
- Metreon
- MG/MemoryStick (logo)
- Micro Beam
- Micro Vault
- Microblack
- Microfocus
- MICROMV
- MID
- MiniDisc (logo)
- MiniDV
- Mirrorblack
- Missioncontrol
- MobilePort
- Mobile ES
- Motion Eye
- MovieShaker
- MPEG IMX
- Multi Channel Access
- Multi Disc Player
- Multi-Channel Access
- Multiscan
- Music Clip
- Music Pops
- Musiclub
- Musicruise
- Muteki
- My Entertainment, My Place, My Time
- My First Sony
- My Life Online
- Mylo

== N ==
- NanoOs
- Nasne
- nav-u
- Net MD
- Network SmartCapture
- Network Walkman
- Newsbase
- NewsCache
- NEWS
- NightShot and NightShot 0 Lux
- No One Can Duplicate Us
- No Sweat Internet
- NURO 光
  - NURO 5G
  - NURO Biz
  - NURO 光 Safe
  - NURO Mobile
  - NURO 光 Connect
- Nothing Escapes Us

== O ==
- OctaStation 2.4
- Ohm Page
- On Time Support
- One Box, One System, One Simple Set-Up, One Unbelievable Experience
- OpenMG
- OPENR
- Optiarc
- Orchestra Seat
- Our Media Is Your Memory

== P ==
- PacITman
- Pan Focus
- PanFocus
- PC by Sony
- PC Cam
- PCBacker
- poiq (logo)
- Pen Tablet (logo)
- Personal Technology Experience
- Personal-Jet
- PetaApp
- PetaBack
- PetaServe
- PetaSite
- PhatFree
- PhatMan
- PhatPig
- Photoegg
- Pico Player
- Picture Paradise
- PictureBook
- Pictured!
- PictureGear
- PicturePark
- PictureToy
- Pit Signal Processing (logo)
- PJ CALC!
- PJ Projects!
- Plasmatron
- Platinum Plus
- PlatinumPlus
- Playlist Builder
- PlayNow
- PlayStation
- PlayStation (console)
- PlayStation 2
- PlayStation BB
- PlayStation 3
- PlayStation Home
- PlayStation Network
- PlayStation 4
- PlayStation 5
- PlayStation Portable
- PlayStation Vita
- PlayStation Productions
- PlayStation Studios
- PlayStation Originals
- PlayStation Classic
- PlayStation Showcase
- PlayStation Stars
- PlayTV
- Plug and Present
- PocketStation
- Polygoneater
- PocketBit
- Portable Music (logo)
- Portable Music icon
- Portable Music With Style
- Power Burn
- Power Cinema
- Power HAD
- Power HAD WS
- Power Play
- Powerful for Work, Portable for Play
- Precision Drive
- Pressman
- PRO 8
- Pro Dat Plus
- Pro-Optic
- Profeel
- Program Palette
- Projector Station
- ProMavica
- ProSound
- PSone
- PSX
- PSYC (not to be confused with PSYC, which is prior art)
- Pyxis

== Q ==
- Qbric
- QIC (logo)
- Qualia (logo)
- Qic (logo)
- Qic-ER
- QRIO
- QS 2.4 (logo)
- QSDI
- Quadrastation 2.4
- Quick Start
- Quickset
- QuickShare

== R ==
- R2 Reality Regenerator (logo)
- Random Music Sensor (RMS)
- Rapid Access
- Ready-Focus
- ReadyCharge
- Real-Time Storage Workhorse
- Reality Regenerator
- RealView
- Remote Commander
- Repeat Learning System
- Rewarding Recording
- RITE
- Rotary Commander
- Ruvi
- Rolly
- Reader

== S ==
- S-Cache Accelerated (logo)
- S-Link
- S-Master
- S-TACT
- S2
- S2 SPORTS (logo)
- SA-CD
- Scene Shuffle
- Scoopman
- ScreenBlast
- SD (logo)
- Search Media
- SecondOpinion
- Seeing is Believing
- Select
- Selfset
- Series 7
- Servo Stabilizer
- Setup Log
- Setup Navi
- Shigei
- Shoot! Store! Show!
- Shot Box
- Side Shot
- Signal Seeker
- SignalSeeker
- SiteLink
- SIXAXIS
- SlimDock
- Smart Control
- SmartDome
- SmartFile
- SmartProjector
- Smooth Scan
- SmoothScan
- Snap Shot
- SnapJack
- SnapShot
- SnapLab
- Snoozinator
- SOBAX (Calculator Line; "Solid State Abacus")
- So-net
- So The Beat Goes On
- SoftwarePlus
- Solar Window
- Soloist
- SonicFlow
- SonicStage
- SonicStage Mastering Studio
- Sony
- Sony Pictures
- Sony Pictures Motion Picture Group
- Sony Pictures Home Entertainment
- Sony Pictures Worldwide Acquisitions
- Sony Pictures Television
- Sony Pictures Television Networks
- Sony Pictures Networks India
- Sony Card
- Sony Interactive Entertainment
- Sony Entertainment Network
- Sony Data Storage. When the Data Really Matters.
- Sony Dynamic Digital Sound
- Sony DADC
- Sony Electronics Inc.
- Sony Ericsson
- Sony Express
- Sony Financial Group (logo)
  - Sony Life
  - Sony Bank
- Sony Graphics (logo)
- Sony Global Solutions
- Sony Honda Mobility
- Sony Innovators
- Sony Mobile (logo)
- Sony Music
- Sony Music Publishing
- Sony Music Group
- Sony Music Entertainment Japan
- Sony Module Express
- Sony Online Entertainment
- Sony Olympus Medical Solutions Inc.
- Sony Plaza
- Sony Security Systems (logo)
- Sony Signatures
- Sony Style
- Sony Style Connect
- Sony Creative Software
- Sony Professional Solutions
- Sony Semiconductor Solutions
  - Lytia
  - AITRIOS
  - Cogitai
  - Spresense
  - Sorplas
  - eSATURNUS
  - DefinedCrowd
  - Cinnamon AI
  - Altair Semiconductor
  - Nevion
  - midokura
  - SoftKinetic
  - AudioKinetic
- Sony Tablet
- Sony VAIO Direct (word & logo)
- Sony Vision-S
- Sony Wonder
- S/PDIF
- Sony-matic
- Sony AI
- Sony CSL
- Sony PCL Inc.
- Sound Is Meant To Be Heard, Not Seen
- Sound-Sensor
- Spec Pro
- Special Cleaning Mechanism
- Special Cleaning Mechanism (logo)
- SPECL
- SpectaPix
- SpectaProof
- Speed Surf
- Speedman (logo)
- Sport MDR
- SportsBand
- Sportsfinder
- Sportspack
- Spressa
- SSD (logo)
- Station Memo
- Star Sphere
- Steady Sound
- SteadyShot
- SteadySound
- SAPARi
- Storage by Sony
- Storage in a Small Format
- Storage Rewards
- Storage Solutions for Every Business Landscape
- StoreManager
- StorSolution
- StorStation
- Straptenna
- Streamphone
- Street Style
- Study Wave
- Style
- Style Cube
- Super Betamovie
- Super Bias
- Super Bit Mapping
- Super Cleaning Mechanism
- Super Coat 2
- Super Data
- Super Fine Pitch
- Super HAD CCD
- Super Head Cleaner
- Super Hi-Band
- Super Performance
- SuperBeta
- SuperBeta Hi Fi
- SuperBeta Hi-Fi
- SuperBetamax
- SuperBright
- Superbrix
- SuperLite
- Supersite
- SuperSlim
- SuperSmart
- SuperStation
- SuperTheater
- SupportNet
- Swing Search
- SwivelScreen
- Sxnet
- SXRD
- Symphony
- Synchro Edit
- System G
- System Link
- SystemAlert
- SystemWatch

== T ==
- Tab Marker Indexing System
- Tap Tunes
- Tape Guide
- Tape Your Best Shot
- TechPort
- Tele Plus
- Telepix
- The Absolute Best Way to Record Your Music
- The Art of the Image
- The Big Screen For Small Rooms
- The Definition of Definition
- The Image Studio
- The Image, Pure and Simple
- The Leader in Digital Audio
- The Leader in Digital Technology
- The Leader in Optical Disc
- The Mini Remote
- The Next Generation of Portable Music Is Coming
- The Next Golden Age of Television
- The Official Currency of Playtime
- The Proof is In the Match
- The Repeater
- The Sony Card
- The Sony Partnership
- The Tape With A Brain
- The Values That Unite Us
- There’s A Story Behind Every Image
- Three oval design mark
- Thumb Scan
- Thumb-cam
- Touch Pad Commander
- Towada Audio
- TrackID
- TR-55
- Triporous (logo)
- TrakCam
- Trans Com
- Trini-lite
- Trinicom
- Trinicom (logo)
- Trinicon
- Trinitone
- Trinitron
- Triple X Program
- TruEye
- Tunnel diode
- Twin-View
- 1 inch Type C

== U ==
- U-ceiver
- U-matic
- Ultimate Color and Sound
- Ultra Personal
- ULT Power Sound
- UMD
- UniCommander
- UniDome
- UniLink
- Unimatch
- Unimatic
- UniPak
- Upgrade Your Image
- USB Direct Connect
- UVWT
- UX Turbo

== V ==
- VAIO
- VAIO Compo
- VAIO Digital Studio
- VAIO Select
- VAIO Slimtop
- VAIO Smart
- VAIO Sphere
- VAIO World
- Vbox
- VCR Mouse
- Vdeck
- Velocity Modulation
- Vialta
- Video 8
- Video Caddy
- Video Hi8
- Video Memo
- Video Printpack
- Video Printpak
- Video Walkman
- Videograph
- Videopress
- VideoStore
- View Font
- View Tools
- VisionTouch
- VisualFlow
- Vivax
- Vizaro

== W ==
- w.ear
- wena
- Walkman
- WanBacker
- WatchCam
- WatchCorder
- Watchman
- WatchSensor
- WAV Link
- Wave Hawk
- WaveHawk
- WebSPF
- WEGA
- Wfine
- What's Next Is Now
- Where the Customer Is The One and Only
- Where The Music Takes You
- wisp.ear
- WorkStation
- World Band Radio
- World Band Receiver
- Worry Free
- Worry Free Recording
- Write ‘n Swipe

== X ==
- X tal Lock
- X-tal Lock
- XBR
- XBR2
- XBRITE
- XDCAM
- xLOUD
- XPERIA
- Xplōd
- Xpri
- XWIDE
- XrossMediaBar

== Y ==
- Your Digital Key To Information

== Z ==
- Z505 SuperSlim Pro
- Zero Footprint Design
- Zero Lux Shot
- Sony Ziris
- Zoomeye
