= Dream Machine =

Dream Machine may refer to:

== Technology ==
- Dream Machine, a text-to-video model developed by Luma Labs
- Dreamachine, a light effect
- Buckeye Dream Machine, an American powered parachute design
- Sony Dream Machine, a line of clock radios by Sony

== Media ==
- "The Dream Machine", an episode of Astro Boy
- Computer Lib/Dream Machines, a 1974 two-in-one set book by Ted Nelson
- Dream Machine (film), a 1990 direct-to-video thriller film
- The Dream Machine (miniseries), a 1992, BBC documentary series, on the history of computing, released in the US as The Machine That Changed the World
- Dreaming Machine (夢みる機械 Yume Miru Kikai), an unfinished anime film by Satoshi Kon
- "Dream Machine" (Dexter's Laboratory), an episode of the animated television series Dexter's Laboratory
- The Dream Machine (video game), an episodic video game started in 2010
- Dream Machines, an American TV series
- The Dream Machine: J.C.R. Licklider and the Revolution That Made Computing Personal, a 2001 biography of Internet pioneer J. C. R. Licklider

== Other ==
- Troy Graham (1949–2002), professional wrestler whose nickname is The Dream Machine
- Dream Machine, a Calaway Park amusement park ride
- Dream Machine, a ring name of Kazuo Sakurada
- Dream Machine, a now defunct retail chain of fun centers filled with arcade games and more
- Dream Machine, a device of the product group Unifi by Ubiquiti Networks. "All-in-one console and security gateway designed to support powerful LAN and WiFi networks."

== Music ==
- Dream Machine, a rock band led by Matthew and Doris Melton
- Dream Machine (album), an album by Tokio Hotel
- "Dream Machine", an album by Des Rocs
- "Dream Machine", a song by Alphaville, released as a track on their CD set, Dreamscapes
- "Dream Machine", a track from Scenes from the Second Storey by The God Machine
- "Silver Dream Machine", a song by David Essex
