= Nigel Cabourn =

English fashion designer (1949–2026)

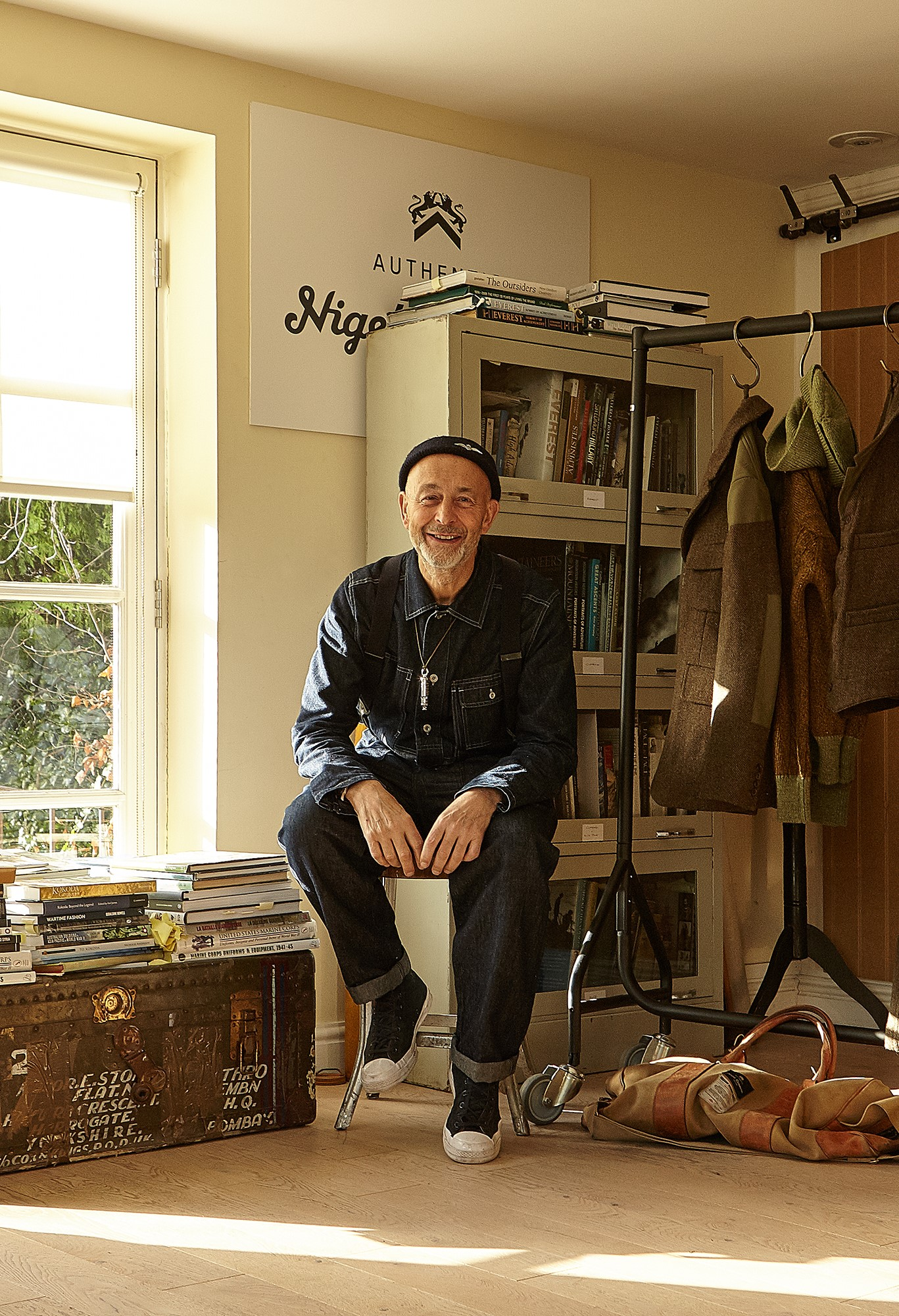
- Born: 7 October 1949 near Scunthorpe, England
- Died: 11 June 2026 (aged 76); Jesmond, Tyne and Wear, England
- Occupation: Fashion designer
- Spouse: Janet Cabourn
- Children: Sophie Cabourn Ben Cabourn Lucy Cabourn

Nigel Cabourn (7 October 1949 – 11 June 2026) was an English fashion designer known for his outerwear and vintage-inspired clothing. He studied fashion design at Northumbria University between 1967 and 1971 and his studio and business is still based in North East England.

== Life and career ==
Cabourn was born near Scunthorpe, England on 7 October 1949. He began his eponymous label in the 1970s, and is known for his menswear collections that are influenced by military clothing and vintage clothing, using fabrics such as Harris Tweed and Ventile.

In August 2008, Nigel Cabourn Marketing Ltd. was set up as a joint venture with Abahouse Holdings Co. Ltd., the joint owner of Outer Limits Co. Ltd., that makes the Nigel Cabourn ‘Mainline’ collection.

The Army Gym was opened in Tokyo in 2009 as a Japanese flagship store for Cabourn's collections.

In 2013, Cabourn launched his first womenswear collection.

In September 2014 he opened his first standalone UK flagship store at 28 Henrietta Street, Covent Garden, London. There are 26 Nigel Cabourn stores around the globe, including 16 in Japan and 8 in China.

Cabourn collaborated with brands including Gloverall, Henri-Lloyd, Converse, Fred Perry, Karrimor, Red Wing Boots, Umbro, and Unimatic.

Cabourn died from cancer on 11 June 2026, aged 76.

== See also ==
- Street fashion
- Ura-Harajuku
- Hiroshi Fujiwara
- Jun Takahashi
