= XBR =

XBR may refer to:

- X-band radar
  - Sea-based X-band Radar
- XBR (Sony) the Sony Trademark
- IATA airport code XBR: Brockville Regional Tackaberry Airport, serving Brockville, Ontario, Canada
- The XBR family of Pixel-art scaling algorithms
