= SmartFile =

VHS labelling technique

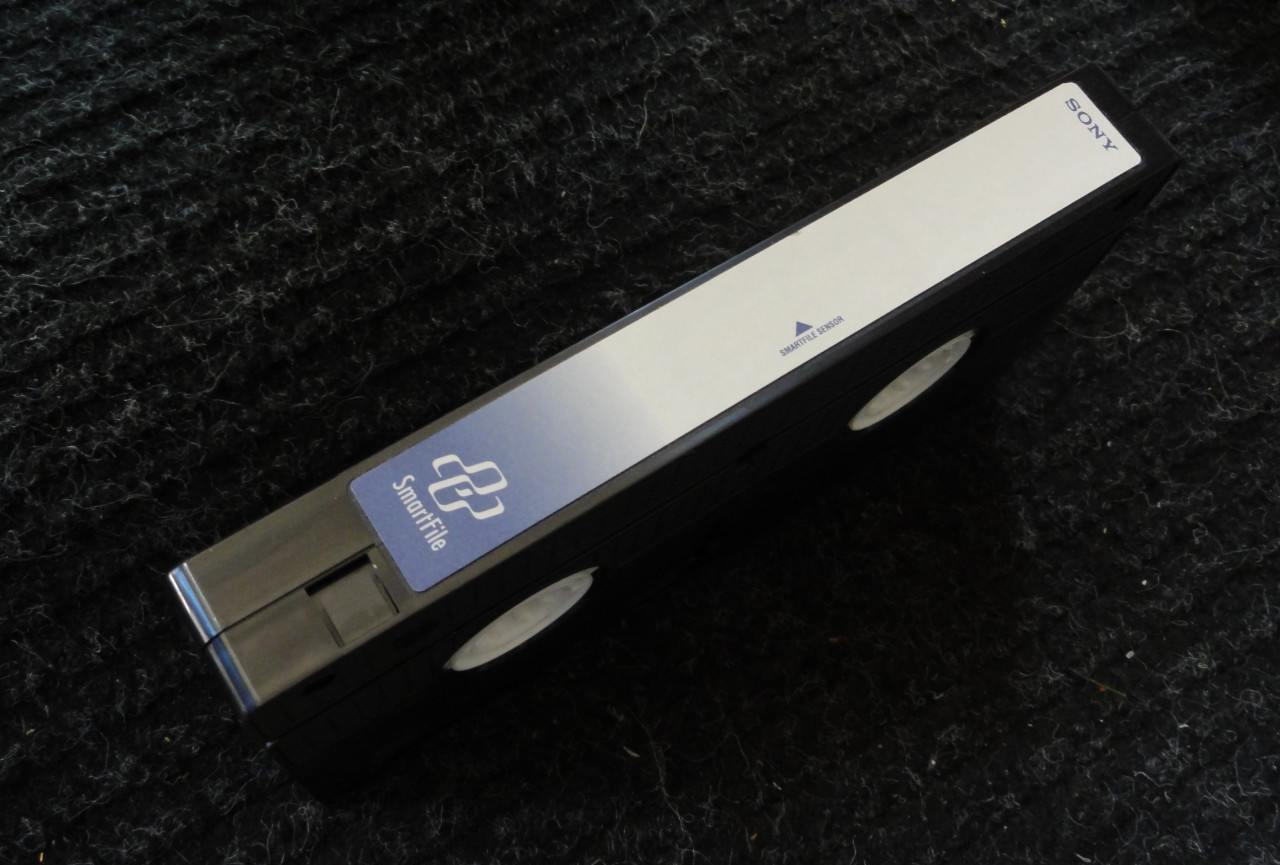
VHS tape with a SmartFile electronic label

SmartFile is a technology used to electronically label a VHS tape with the shows recorded on it. It was created by Sony, who sold SmartFile VCRs in 1997.

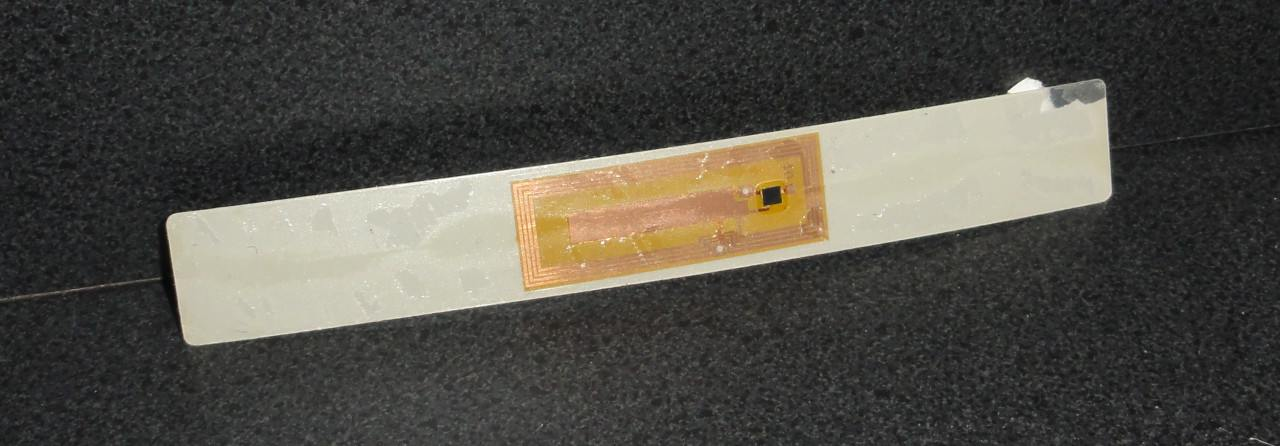
The label contains a small memory chip

The SmartFile design uses a standard VHS tape with an innovative stick-on label that contains a small memory chip. The VCR contains a sensor that is able to wirelessly access the data on this memory chip, and display it on the TV.

By inserting the tape into the VCR, or merely swiping it over the SmartFile sensor, the user can quickly view a list of programs recorded on the tape. The user can also select one of the programs, using the VCR's remote control, and the VCR will automatically seek to the start of that program, and begin playing it.

Blank time is also shown, with the ability to seek to a blank space on the tape.

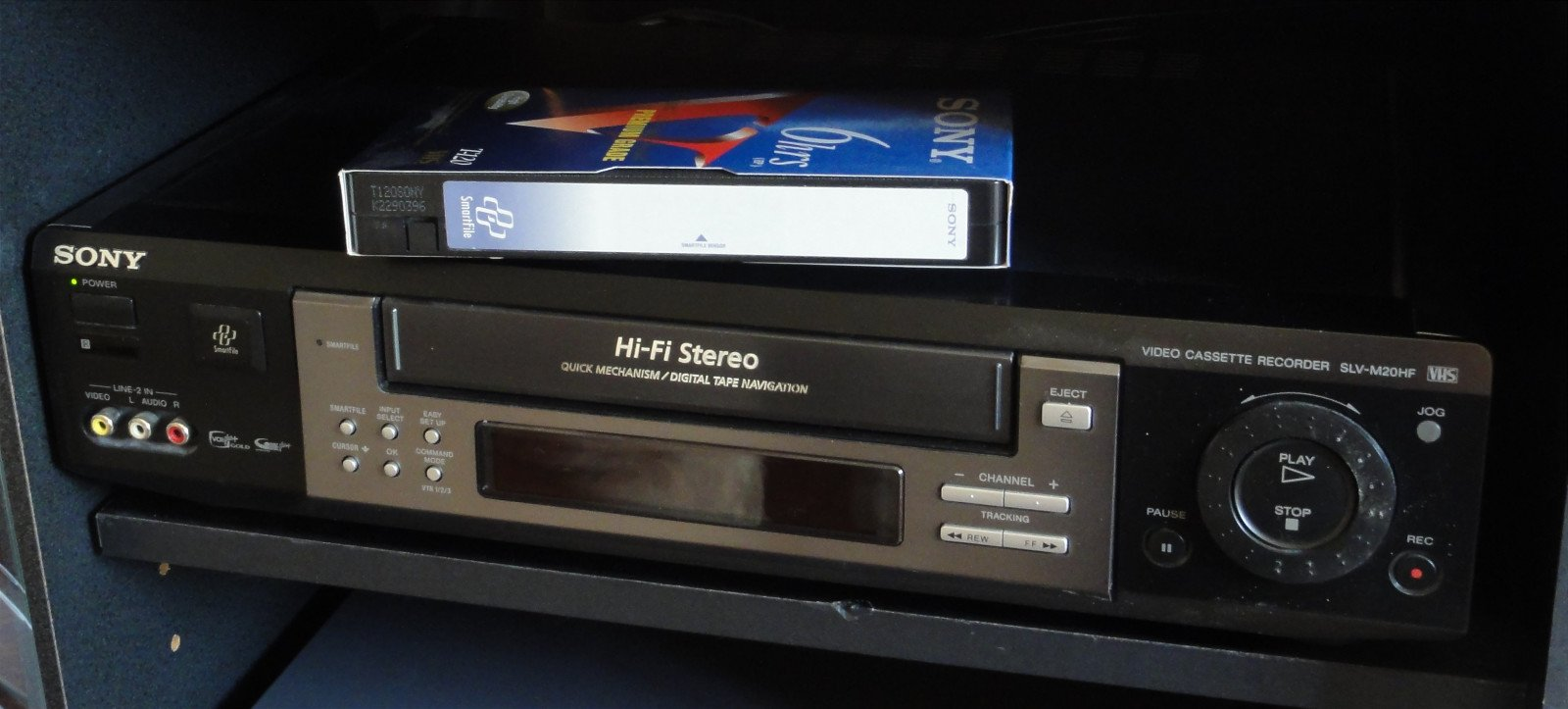
Sony SLV-M20HF VCR featuring SmartFile

SmartFile was eventually superseded by harddisk-based DVRs.

SmartFile is a registered trademark of Sony.
