= Chuck McKibben =

American actor

Charles "Chuck" McKibben (born February 1947 in Dayton, Ohio) is an American voice actor, broadcast producer/director, voice-over coach, audiobook narrator and author. McKibben uses the proper name of "Charles" for his more serious readings.

== Biography ==
=== Education ===
McKibben graduated in 1966 from Belmont High School, Dayton, Ohio. He also attended the University of Cincinnati – College-Conservatory of Music, Broadcasting Division.

=== Early radio career and association with Mel Blanc ===
McKibben began his career as an announcer on WING (AM) in Dayton, Ohio while still in high school. By his mid-20s, he had advanced from various radio positions, such as being the afternoon "drive time" host on Cincinnati station WSAI-FM, to becoming the personal recording engineer/producer and studio manager for "The Man of 1,000 Voices," Mel Blanc. McKibben's daily responsibilities at Mel Blanc Audiomedia in Beverly Hills, California included recording Blanc himself (famed "voice" of a vast number of cartoon characters, including Bugs Bunny, Daffy Duck, Porky Pig, Yosemite Sam, Sylvester and Tweety, etc.) for a variety of motion picture, advertising and theme park projects. In addition, McKibben conducted recording sessions for commercials and syndicated radio programs with performers such as Academy Award-winning actors Kirk Douglas and Jack Palance, comedian Jack Benny, Edgar Allan Poe "master interpreter" Vincent Price, Twilight Zone creator and host Rod Serling, plus voice artists such as Ernie Anderson, "Pillsbury Doughboy" Paul Frees, American Top 40 radio program host Casey Kasem and Laugh In announcer Gary Owens.

=== Broadcasting career in New York City ===
McKibben's experience in Los Angeles was followed by a 30-year career (1976–2006) in New York City as the writer, producer, director and frequent "voice" of numerous radio and TV ads. Among his top producing credits were commercials that he created for the New York/New Jersey/Connecticut Cadillac Dealer Association, filmed on New York's largest motion picture stages at both the Silvercup and Kauffman-Astoria studios. Although he worked primarily as the broadcast production director for two advertising agencies and received numerous industry awards for his creative efforts, he also enjoyed considerable acceptance as a freelance voice artist in the New York market and nationally.

=== Credits as a spokesperson and author ===
In the late 1980s McKibben was chosen to launch the "My First Sony" line of children's electronics as the sole national TV spokesperson, and through the 90's, he was a daily "presence" for New York viewers as the senior promo announcer for Time Warner Cable of New York City. Crain's New York Business magazine employed him as a radio spokesperson, starting with the publication's inception, for over 100 weekly commercials. McKibben's longest association as a TV spokesman for any advertiser was his 15-year run with Lexus of Smithtown (Long Island), completed just prior to his leaving New York.

McKibben is a published author of a book entitled "Mel Blanc, the Voice of Bugs Bunny…and Me: Inside the Studio with Hollywood’s Man of 1,000 Voices." Published as a Kindle e-book and audio book on Amazon in 2017, it is also available in print. The book is a memoir of McKibben’s working with Mel Blanc. Mel’s son, Noel Blanc, contributed substantial commentary to it. McKibben has been interviewed twice on video about his career, first in 2011, then 2018.

Although he continues to record commercials and narration for clients as far away as Abu Dhabi, since January 2007 (when he moved to Philadelphia, Pennsylvania) Chuck McKibben has concentrated on producing and narrating audiobooks distributed on Amazon.com, Audible.com and iTunes, and on teaching.

=== Teaching ===
McKibben is a private instructor of voice-over skills for aspiring voice actors, and he produces demo recordings for them in his home studio. His name appears at www.harlanhogan.com in the list of recommended voice-over coaches on the East Coast.

== Works ==
- "Mel Blanc, the Voice of Bugs Bunny...and Me: Inside the Studio with Hollywood's Man of 1,000 Voices," by Chuck McKibben. ISBN 1948339218; ISBN 9781948339216. Print version: Available at www.thebookpatch.com under "Mel Blanc" search. Audiobook: Chuck McKibben, producer and narrator.
- Tumbles, the Turtle that Got Glued Back Together. Audiobook: Chuck McKibben, producer and narrator.
- Shadow Kingdoms, by R. E. Howard. Audiobook: contains story, The Lost Race, Charles McKibben, producer and narrator. ISBN 978-1-897304-12-9
- The Time Traders, by Andre Norton. Audiobook: Charles McKibben, producer and narrator.
- The Strange Case of Dr. Jeckyll and Mr. Hyde, by Robert Louis Stevenson. Audiobook: Charles McKibben, producer and narrator. ISBN 978-1-897304-05-1
- The Things that are Not There, by C. J. Henderson. Audiobook: Charles McKibben, producer and narrator. ISBN 978-1-897304-42-6
- Voodoo Planet, by Andre Norton. Audiobook: Charles McKibben, producer and narrator. ISBN 978-1-897304-37-2
- In November 2015, The Center City Philadelphia Macy's store invited McKibben to become their announcer for the annual Christmas Light Show, a 50-year Philadelphia tradition held in the former Wanamaker's location next to City Hall. This position was formerly held by the late John Facenda, the original voice of NFL Films. McKibben introduces the light show spectacular, and its narrator, Julie Andrews. Several hundred thousand people take in this event every year.
