= Sony Dream Machine =

Clock radio brand (ca. 1960s–2010s)

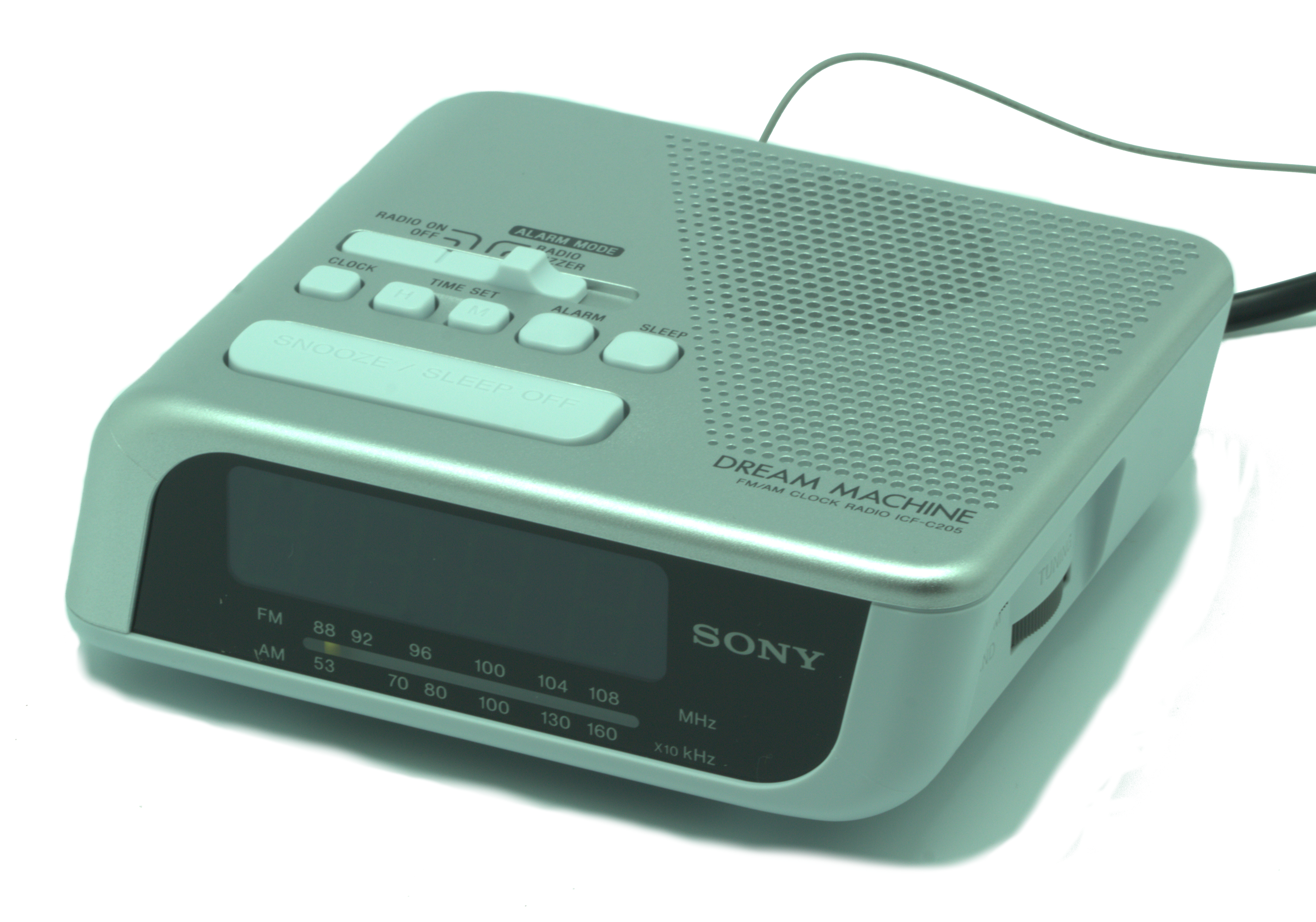
- Sony Dream Machine ICF C205
- Type: Clock radio
- Inventor: Sony
- Inception: 1960s
- Manufacturer: Sony
- Available: Discontinued (Brand name)
- Last production year: Early 2010s
- Models: 8FC-59W, ICF-C10W, ICF-C318, ICF-CL75iP, and others

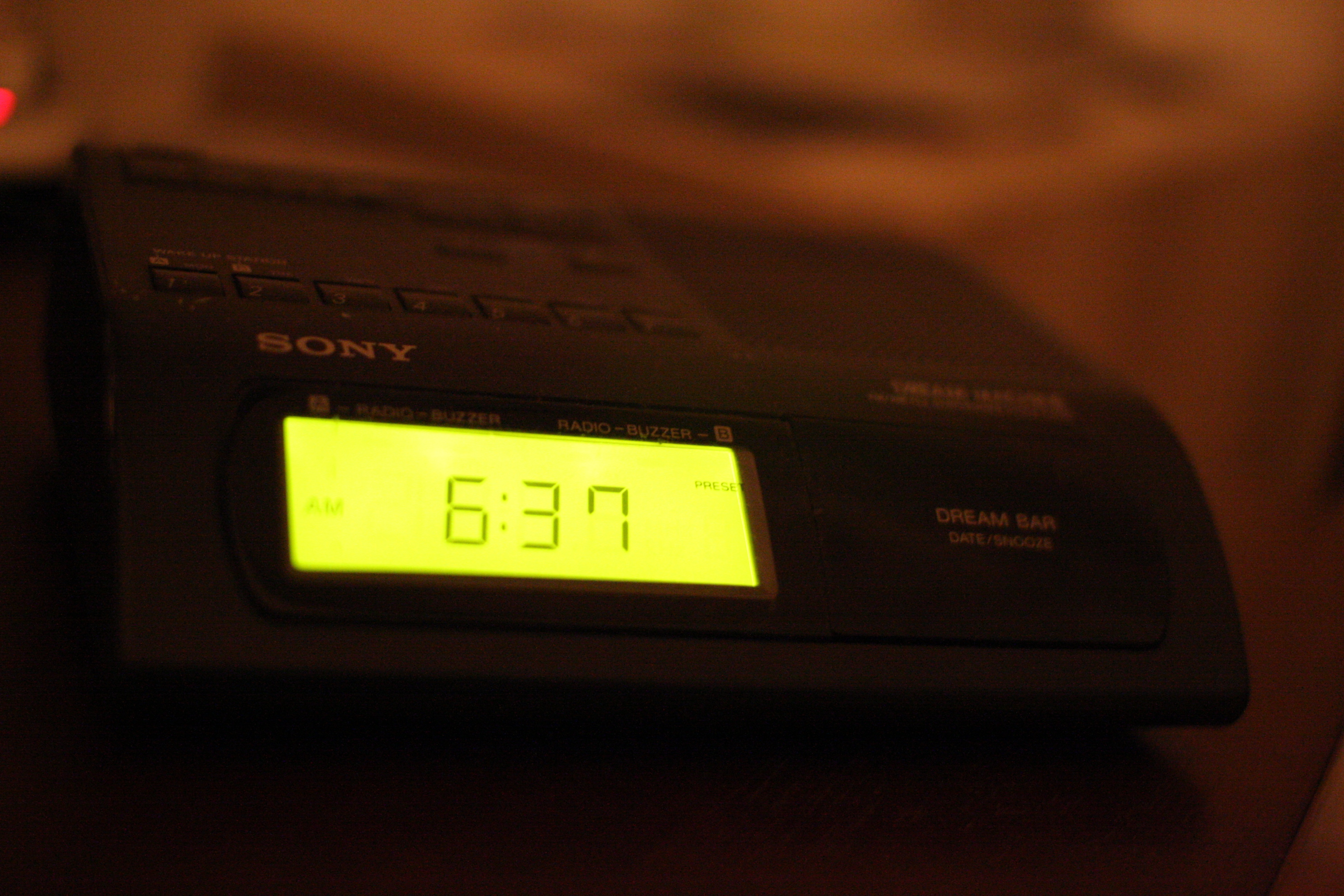
Sony Dream Machine alarm clock, with trademark "dream bar" snooze button

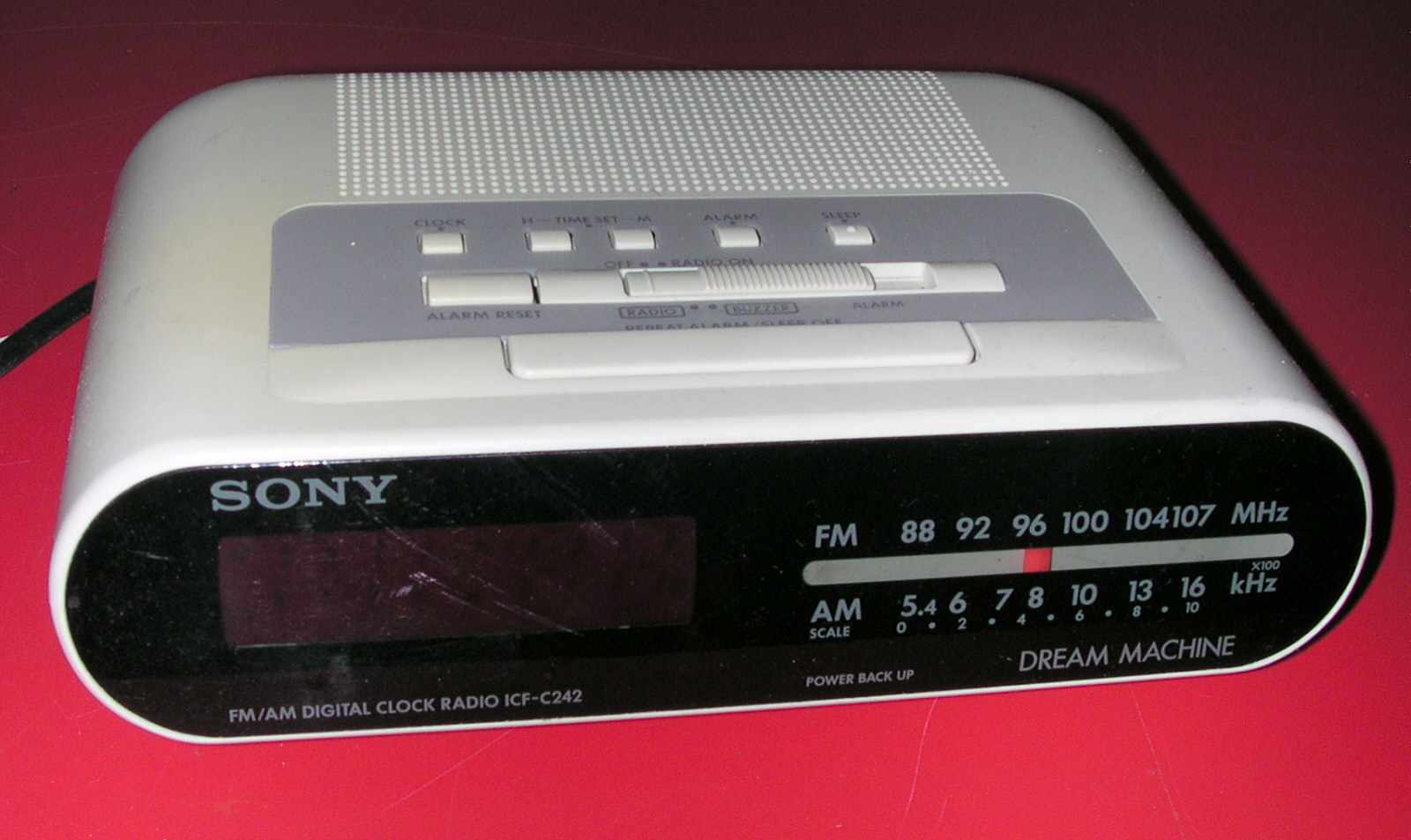
Sony Dream Machine ICF C242

Sony Dream Machine was Sony's long-running line of clock radios. The line was introduced in the early 1960s and ran until the early 2010s.

== History ==
Sony introduced its first clock radios in the mid-1960s; the Dream Machine brand was introduced later. The devices allowed users to wake up to a radio broadcast instead of a conventional alarm sound, as many people found the loud mechanical alarm made by traditional alarm clocks disturbing. The use of direct-read digital display as opposed to a traditional clock dial gave the design a modernistic feel, which reflected the modernist or Space Age design trends of the period. It is not certain if Sony truly invented the concept of digital radio clock with Dream Machine, but it was among the early commercially successful clock-radio product lines. The earliest models were intended only for the Japanese domestic market, and since Sony has never published an official product chronicle, information on these early models has been scarce online and often in Japanese only, sourced from outdated marketing material and old catalogues.

By the late 1960s, Sony began to export these machines and soon they become an international hit. It was a popular choice of holiday gift by early 1970s worldwide. It was one of the first widely adopted home digital appliances. By the mid-1980s many rival products existed, although the Dream Machine line was considered premium due to its stylish design, high quality components, simplicity, ease of use, and good sound quality for its radio. Many original working examples survive to this day with minimal maintenance.

For a short time in the late 2000s, the radio clock market experienced a resurgence, because of several new models including iPod / iPhone 30 pin docks and CD players. By the early 2010s, Sony stopped manufacturing new clocks under the "Dream Machine" name. At the time of discontinuation, the name was used for over forty years.

The "Snooze" button featured in all digital alarm clock, was stylized as "Dream Bar" on a Dream Machine. In Japan, Dream Machine's Alarm function is called "Ohayo" mode which literally means "Good Morning" in English.

For certain markets and eras, Sony would use other commercial names for their radio clock products, such as DIGIMATIC (UK/EU), or Digital 24 (US/North America), however the actual design would be identical or similar to those branded as Dream Machine.

The manufacturing of Dream Machine is an early example of outsourcing. The vast majority of Dream Machines were assembled outside of Japan, in either Hong Kong or Malaysia, and later models were mostly made in China.

== Technical details ==
While the basic idea of the Dream Machine is simply a combination of an analog radio and a digital clock, display technology evolved with time, from mechanical split-flap display at introduction, to VFD (1970s - 80s), and eventually to more energy efficient LED / OLED (primarily 1990s onward). Certain later models were also capable of docking digital players such as iPod and iPhone, serving as an amplifier for the external device.

Other than a handful of 1960s models which used synchronized motor driven flip page, most Dream Machine was powered by the use of specialized microcontroller optimized for digital clocks. With the use of one single microcontroller it is possible to keep time, drive display segments and switch the radio on and off.

Dream Machine's microcontroller uses AC mains power (at 50/60 Hz) as reference signal instead of a crystal oscillator. While this design gives remarkable accuracy, clock pace is not ensured outside of its intended market. Some models (like Japan or AEP model) feature a 50/60 Hz switch, but for models without such a switch, the circuit shall need to be modified if intended to use in an area with a different mains frequency. An optional 6F22 backup battery (later model may use CR2032) can be installed, to prevent a probable power failure event (i.e. a blackout) from resetting the clock.

The vast majority of Dream Machine uses traditional string-pulled tuning for its radio, despite the prevalence of digital phase-locked loop tuning. This is likely to facilitate more intuitive continuous blind tuning for a user lying in bed.

== Models ==
=== 8FC-59W (1968) ===
One of the first clock radios, released in 1968. The clock displays the time by a mechanical flip mechanism. It has an alarm and also has an FM and AM radio.

=== ICF-C11W/C11L (1978?) ===
Released around 1978. Cube body clock radio in various colors, bearing "Digicube" branding. The C11W is FM/AM while the C11L is FM, AM, and LW.

=== ICF-C12/C16 (1981) ===
Introduced in 1981. The C12, nicknamed "Tomato" in Japan, has a cube shape and bright red as color option while C16, nicknamed "Coffee", featured a rectangular design. Both models featured a VFD display, driven by a CMOS microcontroller.

=== ICF-C10W (1982) ===
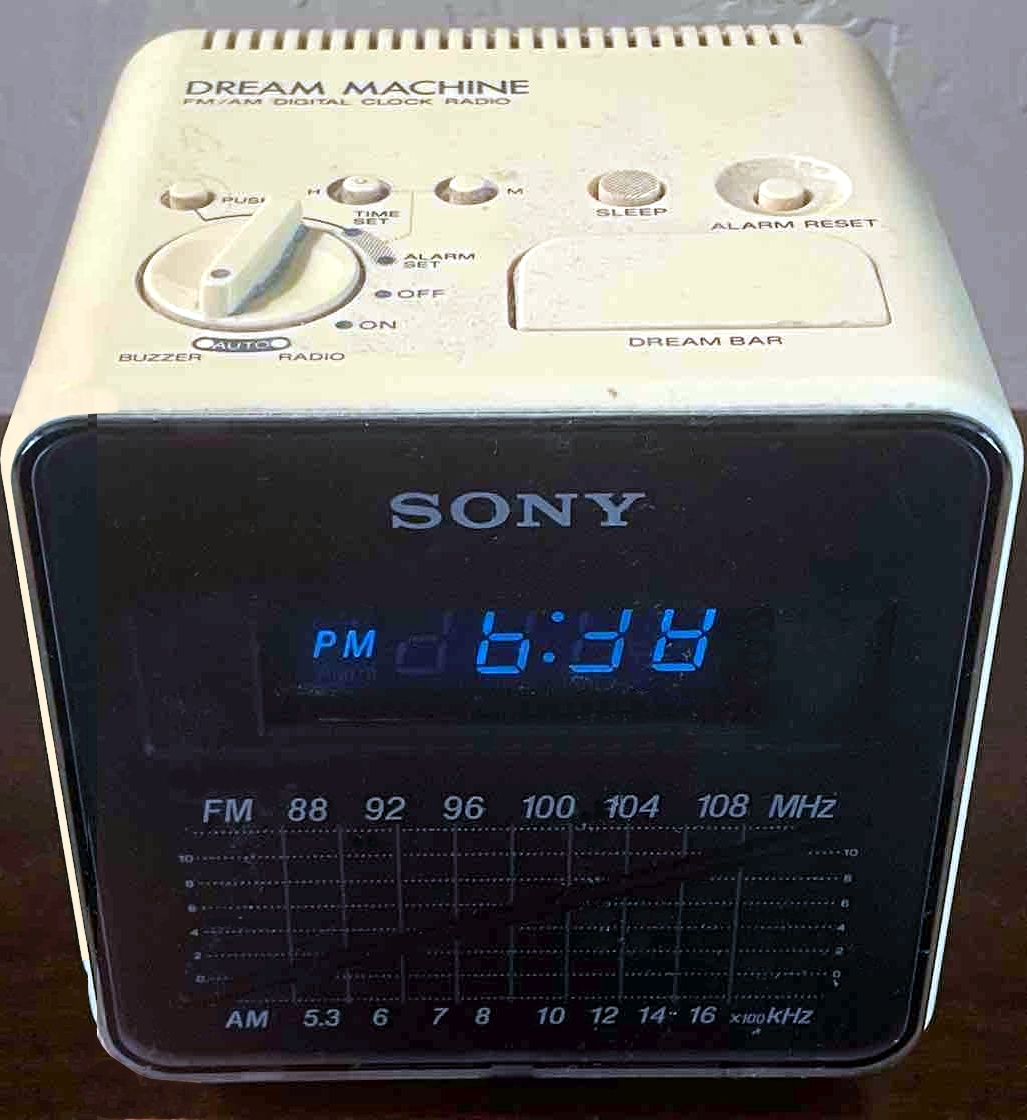
Sony Dream Machine ICF C10W

Released in 1982. An FM/AM digital clock radio with a cube dimension of 4.5 inches all around. It has a 9-volt battery backup at the bottom panel. The front face shows the blue LEDs for the time and the bar dials for FM/AM stations. On the top panel, it has a large rectangular snooze button, and a small round ALARM RESET button in a shallow depressed hole so the user can feel the depression without looking to cancel the alarm. It also has a SLEEP button to leave the radio on from 10 minutes long to 60 minutes long with 10-minute setting intervals. It has both RADIO and BUZZER options. The right side panel has two rounded discs for VOLUME and TUNING adjustments. The left side panel is the speaker.

=== ICF-C3W (1986?) ===
Released around 1986. A clock radio that is very similar to the C2W, but it has a different alarm sound.

=== ICF-C2W (1988) ===
Released in 1988. A clock radio that has a single alarm, a vintage look, and is a standard alarm clock. No battery backup.

=== ICF-C122 (1988?) ===
Released around 1988. FM/AM cube body clock radio in white or black with green LEDs.

=== ICF-C121 (1988?) ===
Released around 1988. Cube body clock radio in white or black with red LEDs.

=== ICF-C120/C120L (1989) ===
Released in 1989. Cube body clock radio in white or black with green LEDs. The C120 has an FM/AM radio and "Dream Machine" on the face, while the C120L has FM, AM, and LW and bears "Digicube" on its face alongside "Dream Machine" branding elsewhere. Similar in appearance to the C122 and C121, but with a different controls layout.

=== ICF-C303 (1991) ===
Released in 1991. A PLL-synthesized clock radio that has a digital tuner, and many features. It has dual alarms, seven preset stations, and AM and FM radio.

=== ICF-CS650 (1991) ===
Released in 1991. A big clock radio that has a cassette player, dual alarms, AM and FM bands, and green LEDs.

=== ICF-C390 (1998) ===
Released in 1998. A clock radio with a flat, half-disc shape, in white or black body, and red or green LED display, AM and FM bands (analog tuner), dual alarms (buzzer + radio), volume knob. Mains powered but it has a 9V backup battery.

=== ICF-C470 (1999) ===
Released in 1999. A clock radio that has a different alarm sound and has a volume control and two different alarms. Two versions were released; the original has a red LED display, and the MK2 has a green LED display. The first alarm is a radio alarm and the second one is the buzzer. It comes with three bands; FM and AM and LW. A 9V battery can be inserted to back up time in the event of power outages.

=== ICF-CD853 (2002) ===
Released in 2002. A clock radio with an FM radio and a CD player. It features a 8 cm orange LED display with different brightness options. It is almost round in shape and came in silver and black colors.

=== ICF-C317 (2003) ===
Released in 2003. It has a large, round snooze button, as well as a buzzer/radio alarm. It supports AM and FM bands, with a tuner and volume adjuster located on the side. It shows a seconds display when you hold down the snooze button. The LEDs are green, showing a twelve-hour time display, with an indicator on the left side of the face to show AM and PM. Most were made in silver and grey, with four short 'legs' at the bottom of its square body. A 9V battery can be inserted to back up time in the event of power outages.

=== ICF-C273 (2004) ===
Released in 2004. A clock radio with three green dimmable backlit displays, one main display and two separate alarm displays. It has a white plastic body and silver blue faceplate, a PLL-synthesized AM/FM tuner with five preset buttons, two alarms with either radio, beeper, or two selectable melodies as wake up chimes, and a nap button. It has no battery backup.

=== ICF-C492 (2005) ===
Released in 2005. It is similar to the C317, but it has a larger display with adjustable brightness. Audio is delivered through an approximately 6.6 cm (2 5/8 inches) diameter speaker with an 8Ω impedance, providing a power output of 120 mW.

For power failure protection, it utilizes a 9V DC battery as a backup, which provides approximately 9 hours of clock and alarm support. The unit's physical dimensions are approximately 198.7 × 101.5 × 109.7 mm, and it has a mass of approximately 640g excluding the battery.

=== ICF-C318 (2006) ===
Released in 2006. A clock radio with a large display and two independent alarms, which can be set to a radio or buzzer. Other features include a 0.9" green LED display, an extendable snooze bar, a built-in calendar with automatic daylight saving time adjustment and a lithium battery for a full power memory back up. Battery life is approximately up to 250 Days with the Sony battery. The model also has a built-in AM/FM radio, with a ferrite bar antenna for AM, a wire antenna for FM, and mono 66mm speakers.

=== ICF-C218 (2006) ===
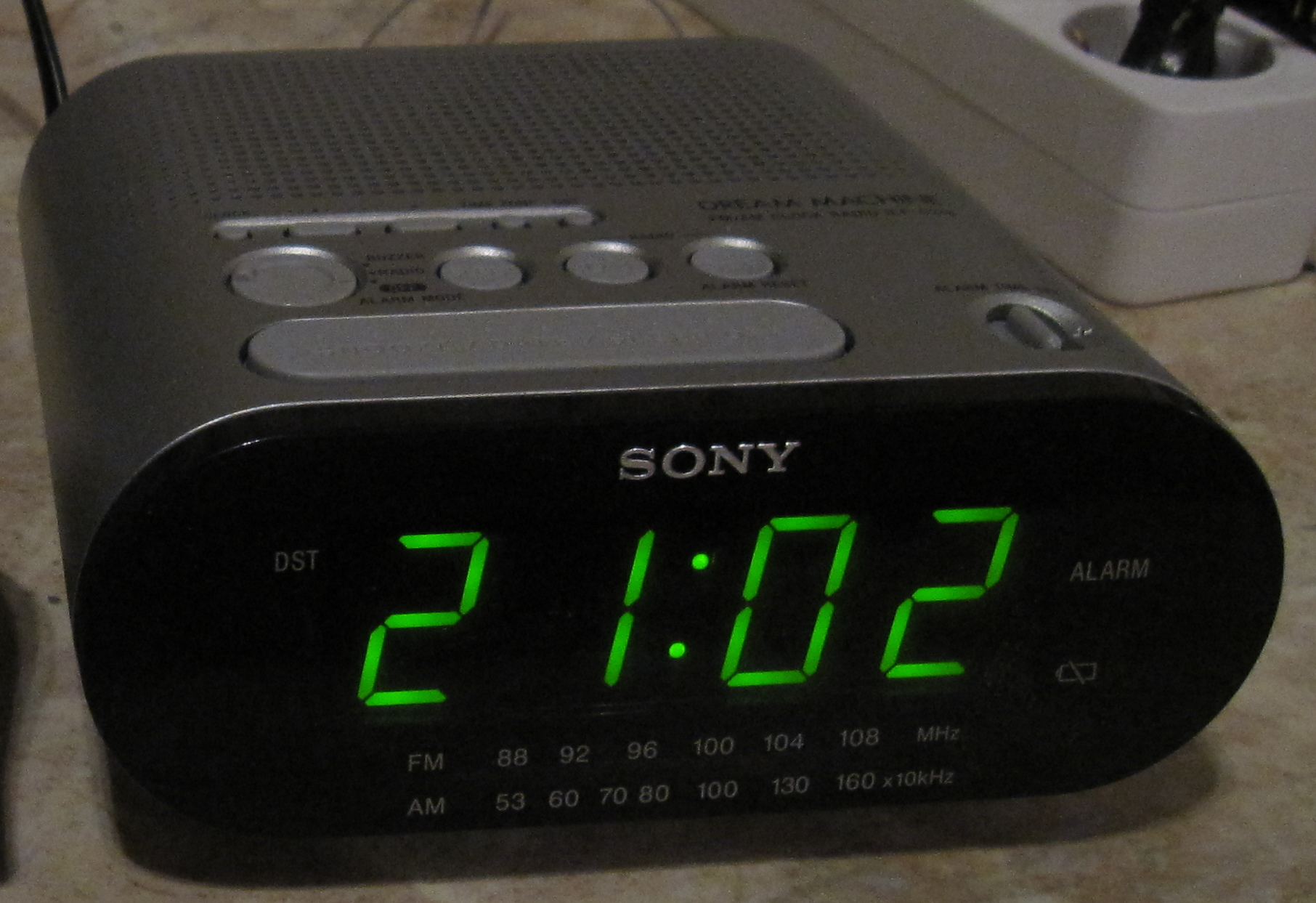
An ICF-C218S

Released in 2006. A clock radio that is similar to the ICF-C318 with the Green LED Display, but it has a single alarm instead of a dual alarm. Same features as the ICF-C318, but it is a different design and almost as the same as the C318. It comes with two bands; FM and AM.

=== ICF-CD3iP (2008) ===
Released in 2008. Has both a CD player and an audio/charging cable for iPhone/iPod integration, adjustable brightness, and an automatic daylight savings time setting. The model's speakers were criticised.

=== ICF-CL75iP/ICF-CL70 (2009) ===
Released in 2009. The device has a 7-inch touch screen that can be used as a photo frame, alarm clock, radio, and iPod dock. It has a 30 pin dock on the right side of the clock. Engadget criticised the limited codec support, but lauded the attractive design and low price tag. They also suggested Sony should add Chumby widget support, a wish Sony later granted with their Dash alarm clock. CNET Australia felt that although it was missing some features consumers might expect from stand-alone devices, the combination of functionality made up for the shortcomings of each of its parts.

=== ICF-C414 (2009) ===
Released in 2009. A clock radio with an extra large green LED 1.4 inch display. It is the same as the ICF-C318, but it is a bigger display. It has dual alarms and radio bands, FM and AM. It also has a melody alarm.

=== ICF-C707/717PJ (2010) ===
Released in 2010. The C707, which is black, is long and rectangular. The main selling point of this clock is the nature sounds for the alarm. The C717PJ, in silver, has a rear projector that can project the time.

== Legacy ==
While "Dream Machine" is no longer used as a marketing trademark since the 2010s, the product line as well as ICF-C designation actually lives on. As of 2024, ICF-C1 is still listed as an active product.

== Notes ==
- news.cnet.com
