= Sony Rolly =

Type of digital music player

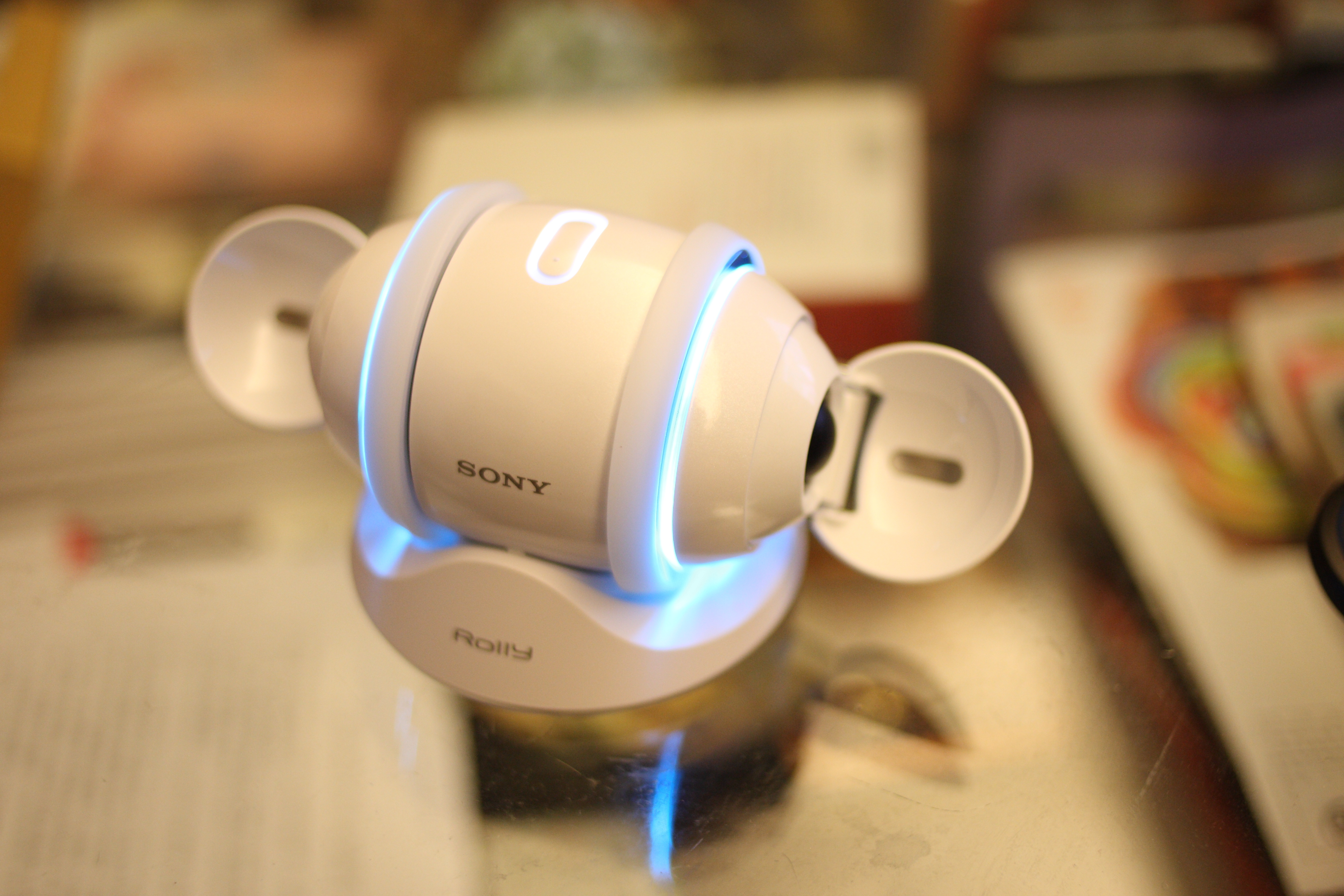
- Sony Rolly on display at a trade show in Japan
- Manufacturer: Sony
- Price: US$399

Rolly was an egg-shaped digital robotic music player made by Sony, combining music functions with robotic dancing. It has two wheels that allow it to rotate and spin, as well as two bands of colored LED light running around its edge and cup-like "wings" (or "arms" according to the Sony sonystyle USA website) which can open and close on either end, all of which can be synchronized to the music being played.

Rolly has several operating modes, including Bluetooth functionality. Rolly can play music streamed directly from any Bluetooth-enabled cell phone, computer, or mp3 player. Rolly is able to dance along to streaming music, but the Rolly Choreographer software produces far better results when it analyzes tracks and creates motion files before loading them onto Rolly. The Rolly player uses .mtf files to store motion data along with a particular music track. Pre-made motion files can be downloaded and uploaded from Rolly Go.

Rolly also has an accelerometer which detects if the player is lying horizontally or being held upright. When held upright, the track next/previous can be controlled by the top wheel and volume up/down can be controlled by the bottom wheel. Tracks can be shuffled by holding the unit upright, pressing the button once, then shaking the unit up and down (light color changes to purple). You can return to continuous play (light color blue) by simply repeating this process.

Rolly has 2 gigabytes of flash memory to store music files. In some markets it came pre-loaded with the track "Boogie Wonderland" by Earth, Wind & Fire.

On August 20, 2007, Sony launched an initial teaser advertising campaign for the product. The product was unveiled on September 20, 2007, and went on sale in Japan on September 29, and was for sale at the Sony sonystyle USA website for US$229.99, down from US$399.99. It is available in black and white. Sony offers the "Engrave it." option for this item, and a number of accessories, including "arms" in different colors.

Around 2009, the Rolly appeared to be discontinued.

== Sony BSP60 ==
In 2015 Sony presented a Bluetooth speaker featuring a similar design and feature set as the Rolly boasted, with the addition of an OLED display and support for voice commands.
