= The Dream Machine (video game) =

- Developer: Cockroach Inc.
- Publisher: Cockroach Inc.
- Director: Anders Gustafsson
- Designers: Anders Gustafsson; Erik Zaring
- Composers: Ale Speranza; Jonathan Adamich; Douglas Holmquist; Jan Cardell
- Platforms: Windows, Mac OS X
- Release: Chapters 1 and 2: Microsoft Windows; WW: December 14, 2010; Chapter 3: Microsoft Windows; WW: October 2011; Chapter 4: Microsoft Windows; WW: August 2013; Chapter 5: Microsoft Windows; WW: November 14, 2014; Chapter 6: Microsoft Windows; WW: May 11, 2017
- Genre: Point-and-click adventure
- Mode: Single-player

The Dream Machine is an episodic point-and-click adventure game developed and published by Cockroach Inc. (Anders Gustafsson and Erik Zaring) Its main themes are dreams and voyeurism. The game was built by hand, using materials such as clay and cardboard. The Dream Machine consists of six chapters released between December 2010 and May 2017. It was nominated for an Independent Games Festival Visual Excellence award in 2011. The game is available on Windows and Mac OS X.

== Gameplay ==
In The Dream Machine the player takes control of the protagonist Victor Neff. The player has to solve puzzles and collect items that can help overcome obstacles in the game.

== Plot ==
The protagonist is Victor Neff, a young, newly wed man who has just moved into a new apartment with his wife. While trying to get settled, he accidentally stumbles upon a hidden camera behind the painting just above his bed. While his wife calls the police, Victor goes around the building searching for Felix Morton, the building's owner, eventually discovering the Dream Machine, a machine that allows a person to enter the dreams of others. The machine then attacks Felix, putting him to sleep, and Victor enters his dreams by using the two "transmitter" and "receiver" helmets. Eventually, Victor finds him and saves him from an oily tentacle. In his dying moments, Felix requests Victor to shut down the Dream Machine by going into all the other attendants' dream worlds (including those of his own wife and unborn child), and destroying the connections there.

The story is split up into six chapters, each chapter featuring a visit to at least one dream world.

== Development ==
The Dream Machine is developed by Cockroach Inc. which is a two-man independent game studio run by Anders Gustafsson and Erik Zaring.

The graphics for the game were almost exclusively created by photographing hand-crafted characters and sceneries. These were created utilising a wide variety of materials such as clay, cardboard, cotton wads, pebbles, baking paper, moss, turf, pipe cleaners, broccoli, lichen, ground coffee, carpet samples, pork chop trimmings, condoms, ping pong balls, Molton cloth, small plastic babies, insulation foam, matchsticks, aluminium foil, latex, yarn, towels, pasta, U.V.-reactive yarn, U.V.-reactive powder, bones and popsicle sticks, among many other things.

The Dream Machine began as a browser-based game, but transitioned onto Steam after being nominated for an IGF award in the Visuals Arts category.

== Reception ==
The Dream Machine's first two chapters were well received on release; on the critic aggregate sites GameRankings it received an average score of 81.50% and on Metacritic an average score of 76.
