= My First Sony =

Series of electronics for kids made by Sony

My First Sony was a series of smaller-scale electronics made by Sony in the mid-late 1980s intended for use by children. They were made of brightly colored plastic, usually red, and large colorful buttons with simplified controls. My First Sony products included a Walkman, amplified microphone with tape deck, recording tape deck, Boom box, alarm clock, electronic sketch pad, and headset walkie talkies. New York-based voiceover artist Chuck McKibben was the network TV spokesman, accompanied by children singing a jingle that went "I like pizza pie, I like macaroni, but what I love is My First Sony!"

In the Spanish translation, the jingle said: "Me gusta cantar, andar en un pony, pero prefiero Mi primer Sony" (I like to sing, to ride a pony, but I prefer My First Sony)

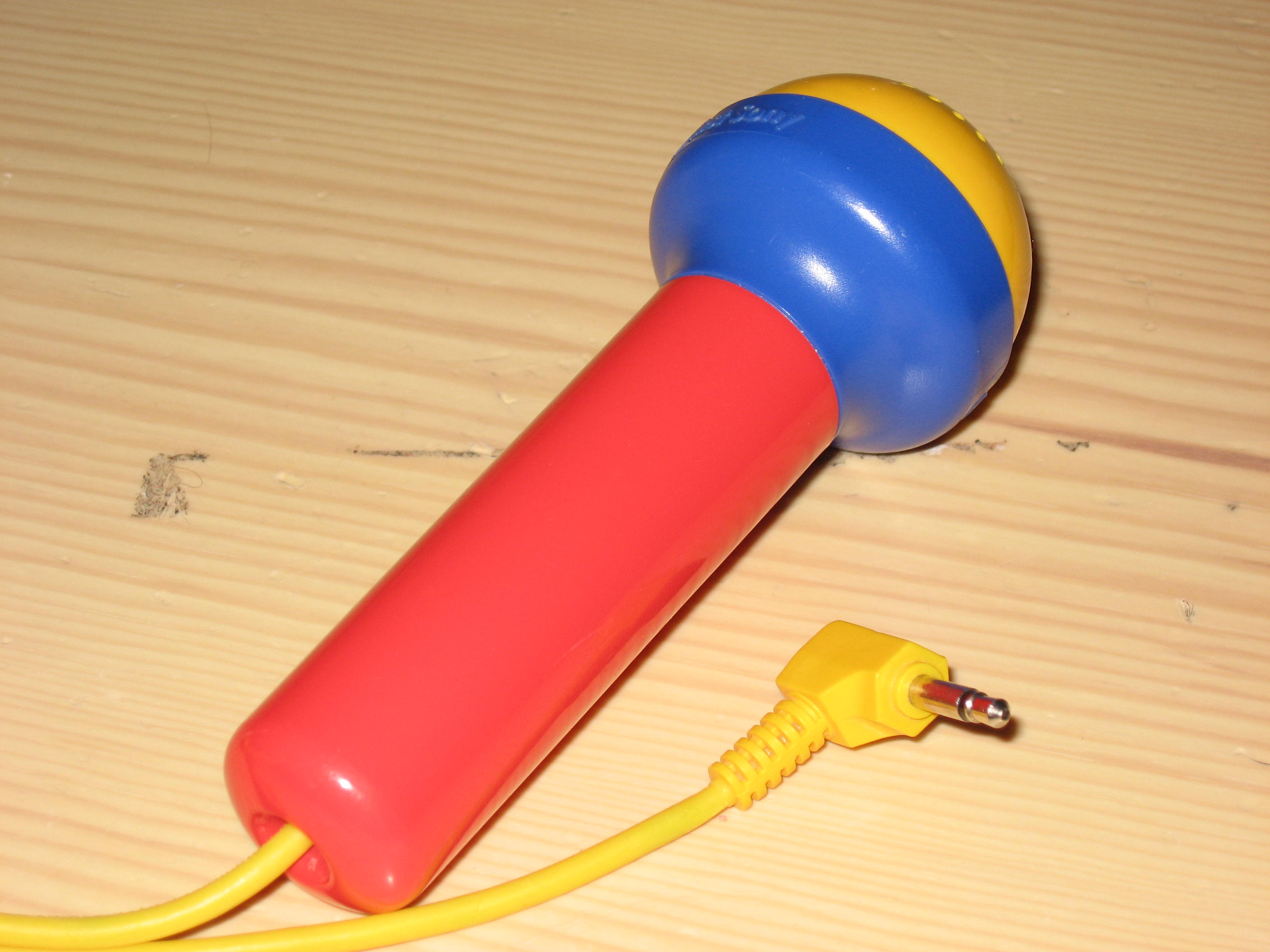
My First Sony microphone

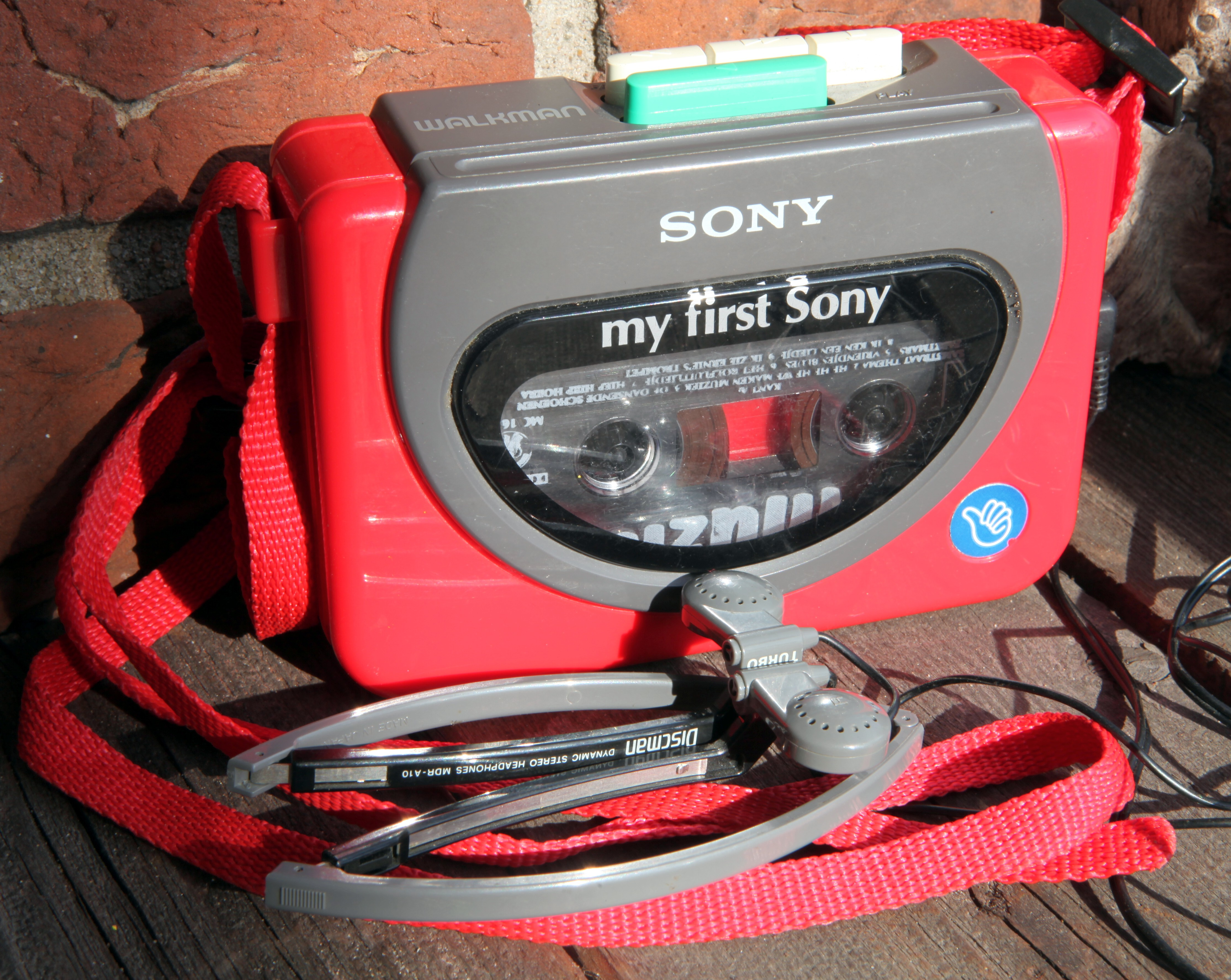
My First Sony Walkman

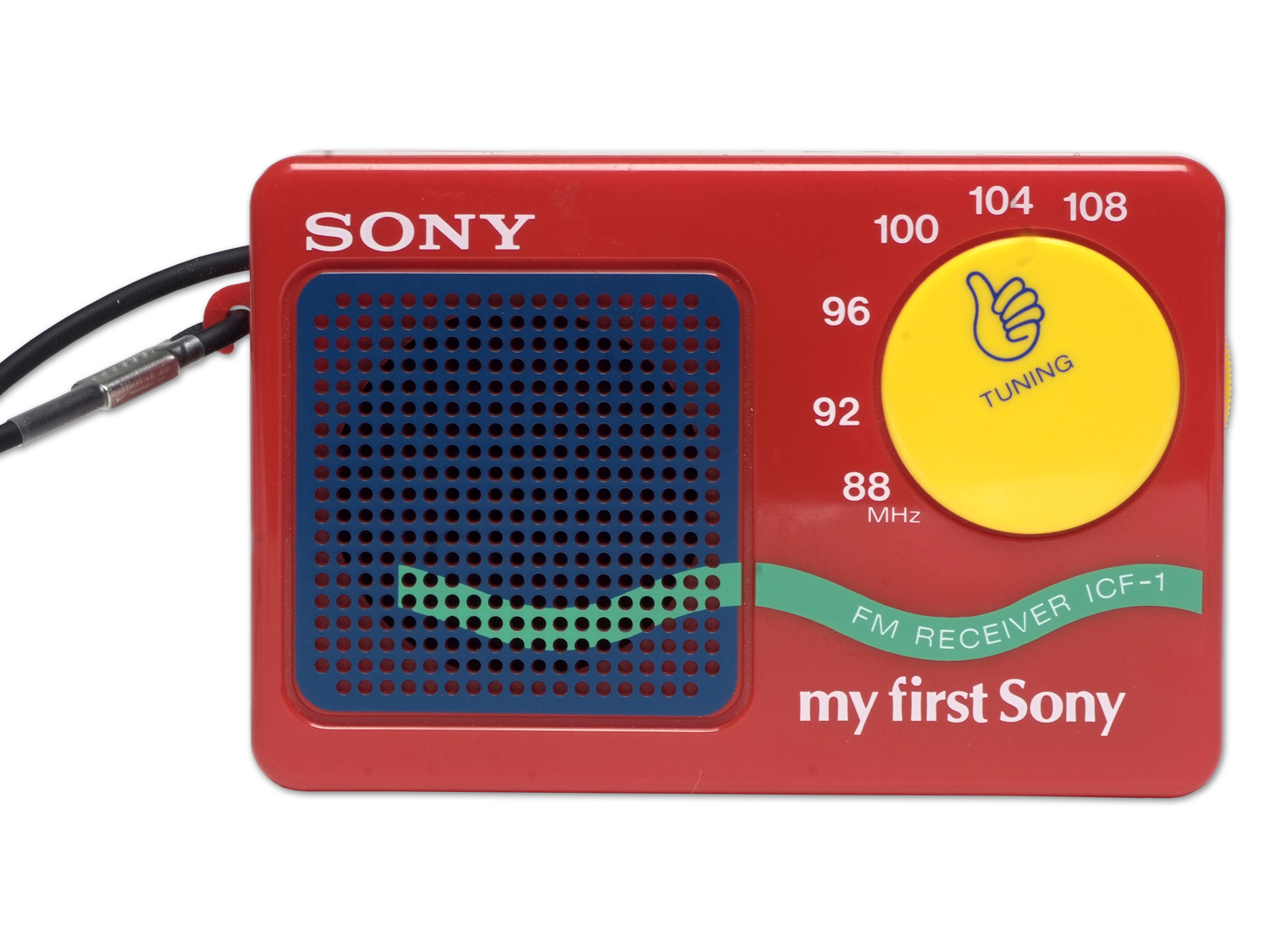
My First Sony FM radio receiver ICF-1 shown in the Huis van Alijn museum

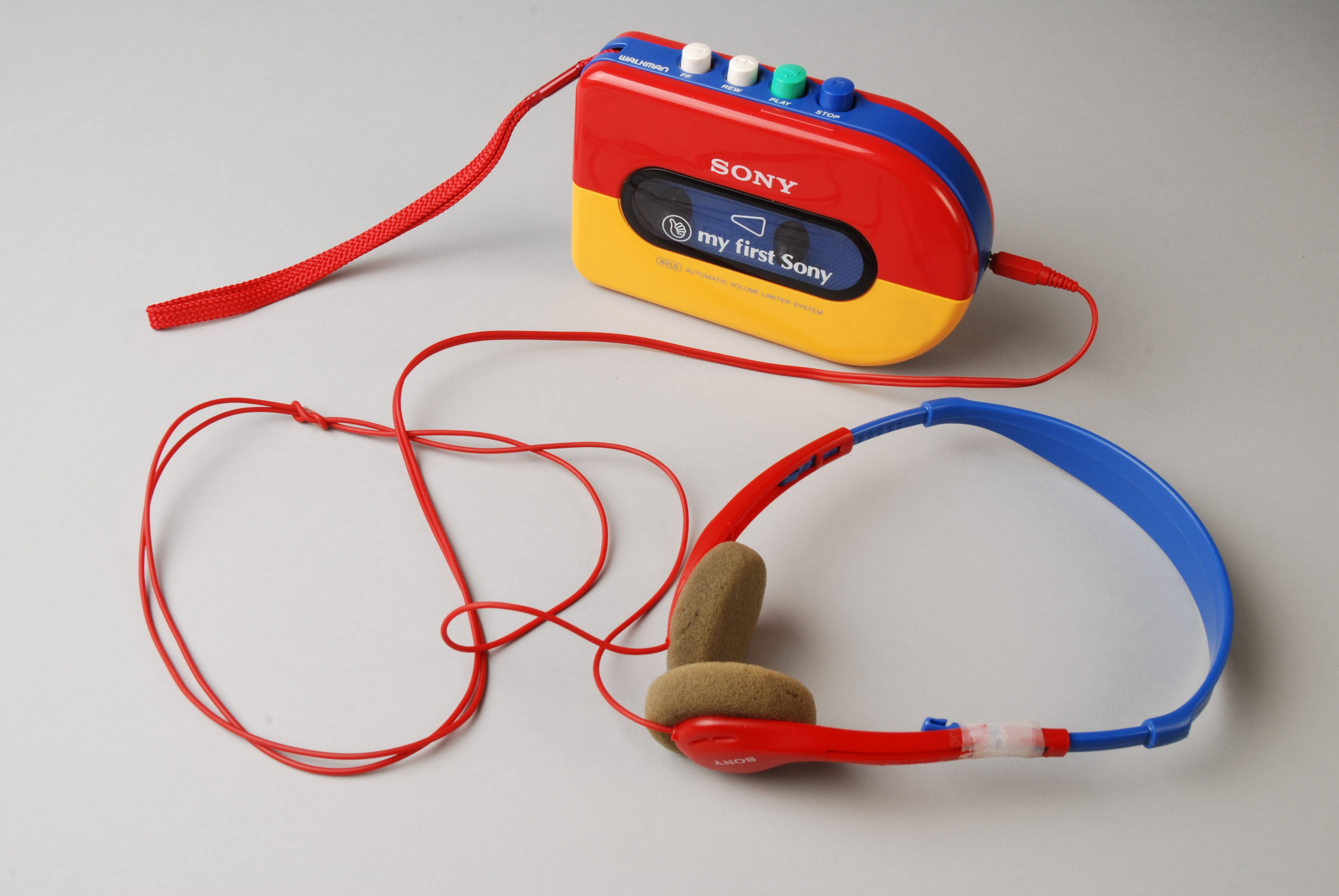
My first Sony Portable Cassette Player
