= TechPort (NASA) =

Technology Portfolio System

NASA TechPort
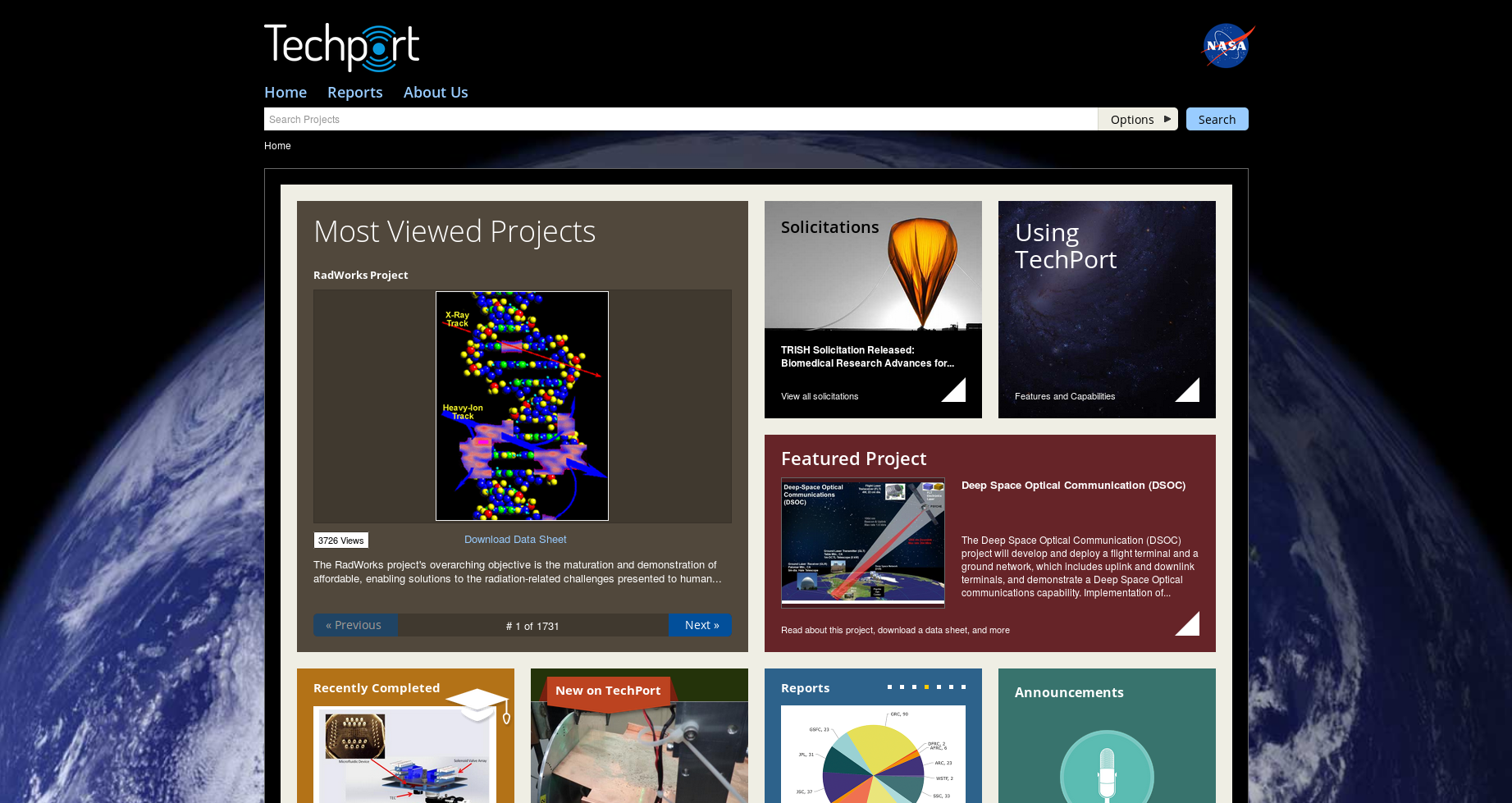
- Home Page of the Current Public NASA TechPort
- Website URL: techport.nasa.gov
- Initial Release Date: October 10, 2012; 12 years ago (released only to NASA personnel and contract staff)
- Second Major Release Date: March 3, 2015; 10 years ago (public was in beta release)
- Current Major Release Date: March 16, 2018; 7 years ago
- Current Major Version: 3

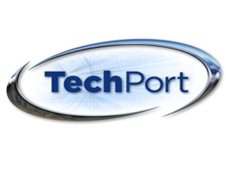
The TechPort logo

TechPort is a Technology Portfolio System for the National Aeronautics and Space Administration (NASA). The TechPort system was created in response to a request by the Office of Management and Budget (OMB), resulting in the NASA Performance Goal 3.4.1.5 and APG 3.4.1.5: ST-12-17.

Document, coordinate, and prioritize Agency-level technology strategic investments to ensure NASA has a balanced portfolio of both near-term NASA mission (pull) technologies and longer-term transformational (push) technologies that benefit both Agency programs and national needs.

— "NASA FY2012 Performance Goal 3.4.1.5"

Ensure that 75 percent of all NASA technology projects are recorded in the portfolio database and are analyzed against the prioritizations in the space technology roadmaps.

— "NASA FY2012 Performance Goal APG 3.4.1.5: ST-12-17"

As part of its mission, TechPort stores research and development:

- Progress
- Funding levels and budget data
- Management information
- Purpose
- Benefits to the nation
- Benefits to the Agency
- Benefits to the Industry
- Status (e.g. completed, cancelled, active)

TechPort also, per the FY2012 Performance goals, contains NASA's Technology Roadmaps, including the 2012 Technology Roadmap and 2015 Technology Roadmap. Research and development can then be compared with the roadmap(s), ensuring that the research matches the roadmap and budget allocations are inline with roadmap priorities.

To ensure compliance, TechPort includes interfaces for humans (the main website), search engines (via sitemaps), and machine readable APIs that follow JSON or XML standards (/api/specifications detailing the API's specification, /api/projects listing all ids, and /api/project/{id}[.{format}] providing the machine-readable data for that item in either XML or JSON, with JSON being used if no extension is given).

As of March 2018, the public instance of TechPort contains 10,677 research and development records.

== History of TechPort ==
On October 28, 2011, the United States President Barack Obama charged all Federal agencies with streamlining and speeding up technology transfer activities. OMB, like-wise, demanded that Agencies release to the public information about currently funded research programs and projects to aid in collaboration both within the public sector and between the public and private sector, as well as better track the progress of all technology development both within the Agency and to Congress. The NASA Office of the Chief Technologist (OCT), which had been created in 2010, was given the task of creating and managing the system(s) that would fulfil these requirements under the NASA 2012 Performance Goal 3.4.1.5 and APG 3.4.1.5: ST-12-17.

In late 2012, TechPort, a complementary system to the NASA New Technology Reports (NTR) database, was released internally to all NASA civil servants and contractors. A public version of the system, with 'sensitive' information removed (e.g. budget data and management information) was initially scheduled to be released in the fall of 2013, however the public system was, instead, released as a public 'beta' on March 3, 2015, after completeness of the data was determined and the system was utilized by NASA personnel for approximately two years.

As of 2014, TechPort continues to be a key part of NASA's Strategic Plan, wherein NASA established the next steps for Strategic Objective 2.3.

=== TechPort 1.0 ===
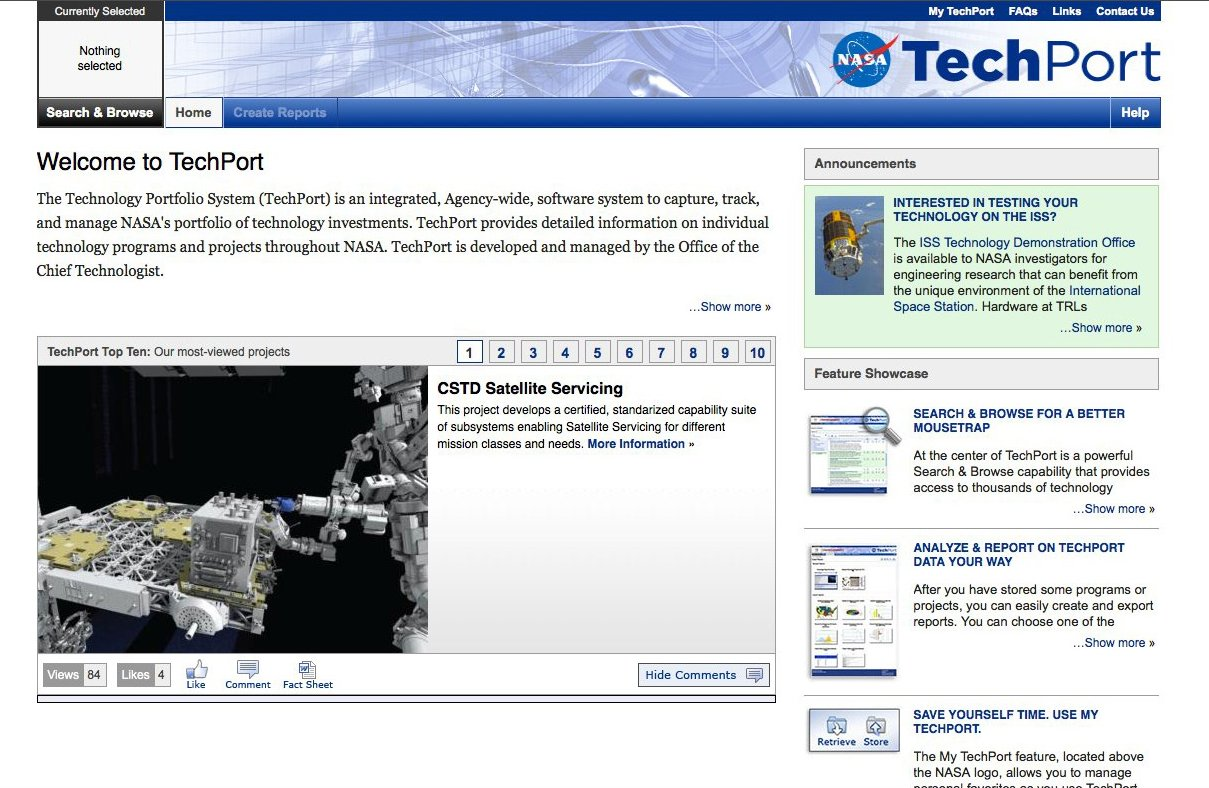
TechPort 1.0 Home Page

The first major release of TechPort was only made available to NASA users and contract staff who were on a NASA installation's internal network or VPN. The first release included the ability to create, review, and update information related to NASA research and development (R&D) efforts; to search existing records; and to run a variety of reports against the data in the system. The main purpose of this release was to pull in data from like systems (e.g. EHB and SBIR), to get additional data and R&D information not in like systems from the NASA community, and to allow NASA personnel to review the data and system prior to public release, which began compliance with the OMB requirements. Multiple data calls occurred following the release to achieve the main goals.

=== TechPort 2.0 ===
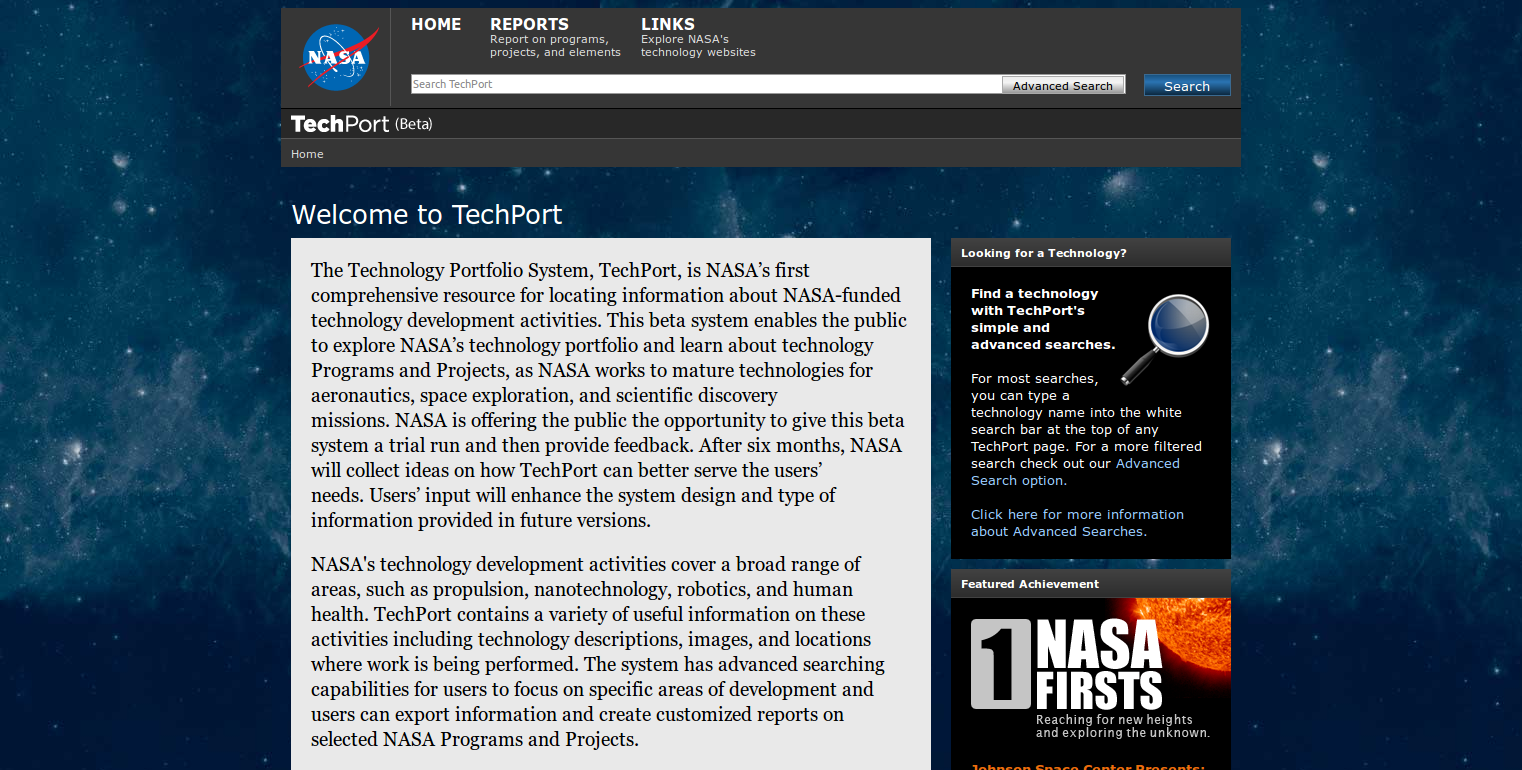
TechPort 2.0 Home Page - Public Release

The second major release of TechPort came with new features and reports for NASA users and contract staff, such as the inclusion of NASA Roadmaps, reports related to the Roadmaps, inclusion of Strategic Technology Investment Plan (STIP) data, a new user interface, and saw the release of TechPort to the general public as a public beta. This release also saw the inclusion of some additional internal fields, such as the Fingerprints section, and the removal and modification of others that had been in the first release, but were rarely used. The inclusion of NASA Roadmaps into the system and the release to the public, though in beta, allowed NASA and TechPort to meet the OMB requirements that had been the precursor for the system's creation.

=== TechPort 3.0 ===
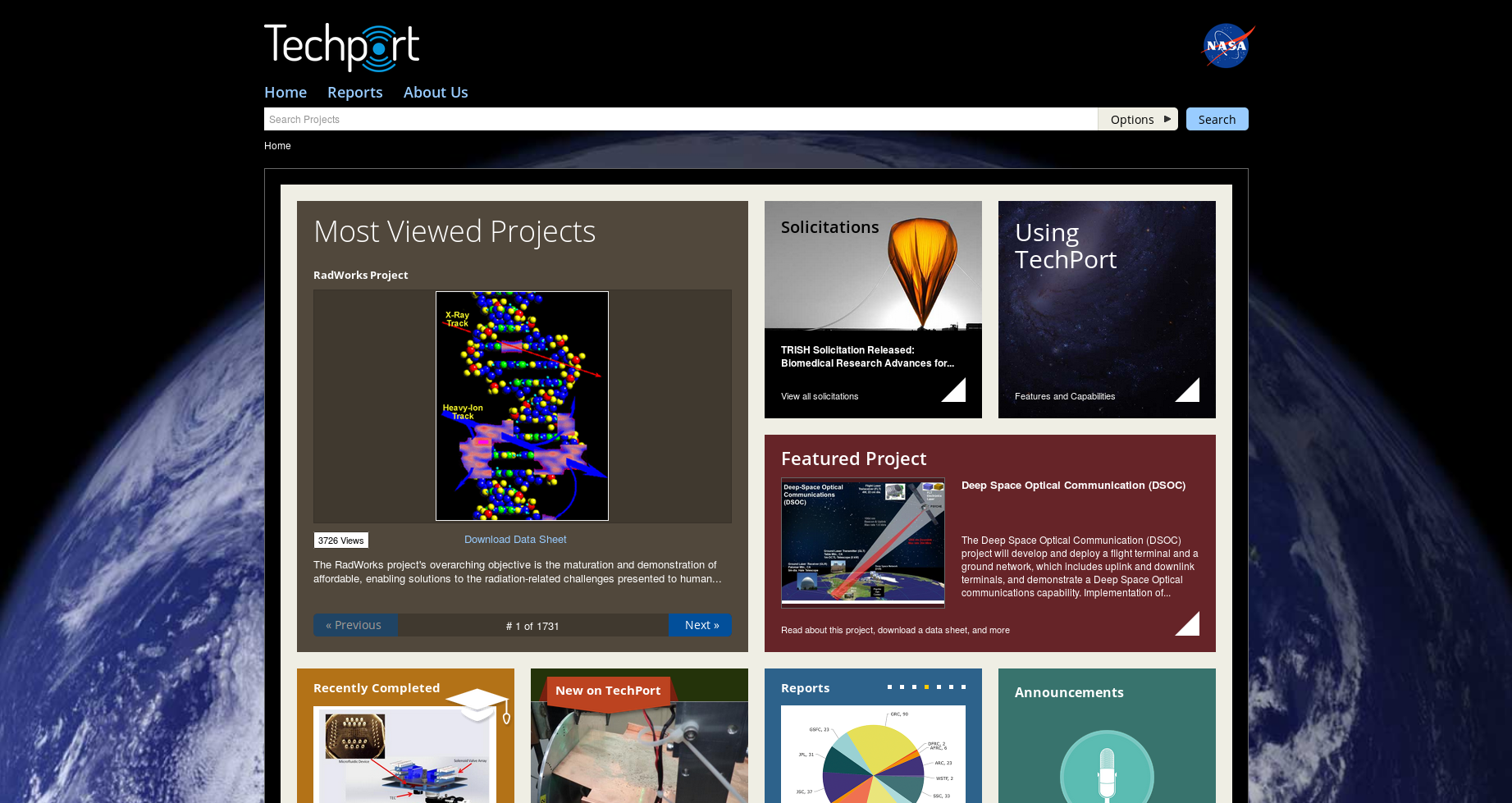
TechPort 3.0 Home Page - Public Release

The third major release of TechPort came with a variety of adjustments based on user feedback, to include a clean user interface, a providing a user dashboard for the home page (with two versions—one for the internal system and one for the public system), a more flexible API that defaults to JSON unless an .xml extension is given, and the reduction of fields to increase usability. This release also saw the collapsing of some of the data fields and an improved search interface, as well as improvements to the sitemaps. Much of the emphasis of the release was to better aid researchers and collaborators both internal to NASA and in the public, as well as a heavy push to ensure data quality and accuracy. The release also saw the renaming of and adjustments to many of the URLs, such as changing the API from /xml-api/ to /api/ and improving speed and reliability of the system, to better aid researchers and organizations that are searching TechPort via the system's built-in search engine or harvesting data via a bot. The last major change in this release was that the public version no longer stated it was a beta release and is responsive.

== Awards ==
In 2015, the TechPort development team, led by ARES Corporation with REI Systems, Tauri Group, and inQbation as subcontractors, was awarded the Group Achievement Award for their work on the TechPort system.

In 2018, the TechPort development team, led by ARES Corporation with REI Systems and Bryce, was awarded the NASA Space Flight Awareness Team Award for their work on the TechPort system.

In 2019, the TechPort development team, led by ARES Corporation with REI Systems and Bryce, was nominated for the Rotary National Award for Space Achievement (RNASA) Stellar Team Award for "Outstanding accomplishment and teamwork in the creation, implementation and operation of NASA’s Technology Portfolio application (TechPort) that has enhanced NASA technology communication across the world."
