= Isara =

Thai international charity organization

Isara Charity Organization
- Founded: 2005, Nong Khai, Thailand
- Purpose: Education, Safety and Environmental Issues
- Region served: Thailand, Nepal, India
- Method: Teaching, Community Development
- Website: Isara.org

Isara Charity Foundation is an international charity organization with projects based out of Nong Khai, Thailand. Isara's projects are primarily focused on education, but also extend to safety and environmental awareness.

== Mission ==
Isara’s mission is to positively impact communities in the areas of education, safety, environmental awareness, and to promote personal effectiveness through global web-based interaction and local volunteerism.

== Origins ==
Isara was founded in 2005 by Kirk Gillock. The organization's first projects were focused on motorcycle safety through its national helmet campaigns. In 2007, Isara expanded its efforts to include the areas of education and the environment.

== Funding ==
Isara generates funds for its projects through their non-profit website. Visitors are encouraged to make the website their browser homepage, which increases their web traffic and sponsorship (advertising) revenue. Volunteers then use 100% of all funds raised to create charity projects benefiting the less fortunate.

== Programs ==
Afterschool Program

Isara has free afternoon and evening classes at their Learning Center in Nong Khai, Thailand. Volunteers teach English and computers to children and adults.

Helmet Campaign
Isara holds assemblies at schools to educate students and the community about the importance of wearing helmets. Isara reinforces the importance of wearing helmets by donating helmets to the students at the schools they visit and enforce a helmets policy at their Learning Center.

Trash Clean-Up

Working with local schools and students, Isara puts together trash clean-ups at schools and local parks to educate about this issue in the community.

Scholarships

Isara provides financial support to students who want to continue their education.

== Recognition ==
In 2008, Isara won a Thailand Humanitarian award for its efforts in their country.
