= UniMatch =

HEADPHONES DESIGN OF SONY

UniMatch refers to a design patented by Sony for stereo headphones, which allows the cord to end in either a 1/8" or a 1/4" jack. This is accomplished by using a 1/8" connector with threading around the base hardwired to the cable, upon which the 1/4" connector can be affixed.
