= Chumby =

Internet appliance

Chumby Industries logo

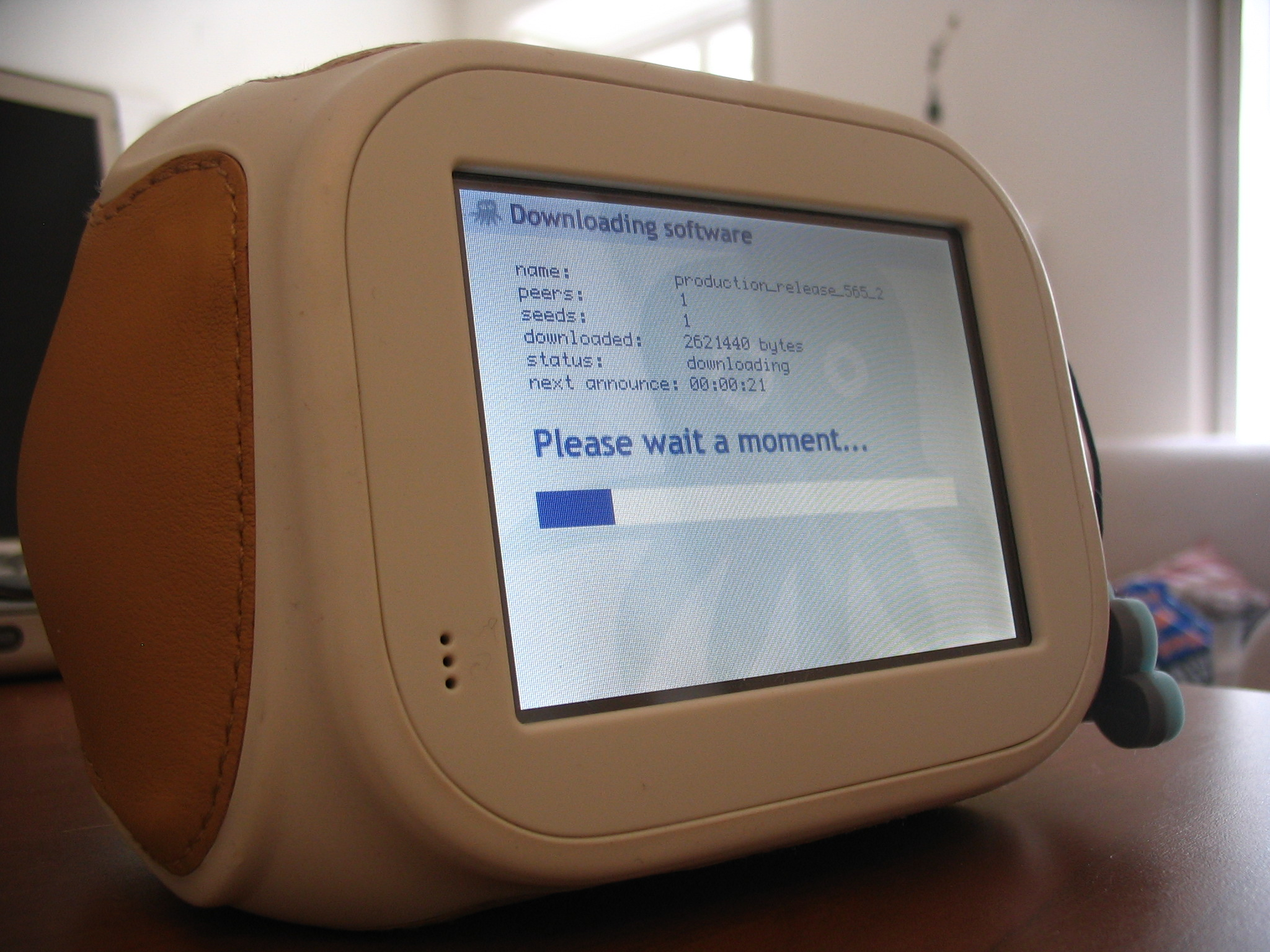
A Chumby in the process of downloading software

The Chumby was a consumer electronics product formerly made by Chumby Industries, Inc. It is an embedded computer which provides Internet and LAN access via a Wi-Fi connection. Through this connection, the Chumby runs various software widgets. In 2010 Sony introduced a single product based on an offshoot version of Chumby, the Sony Dash.

== Devices ==
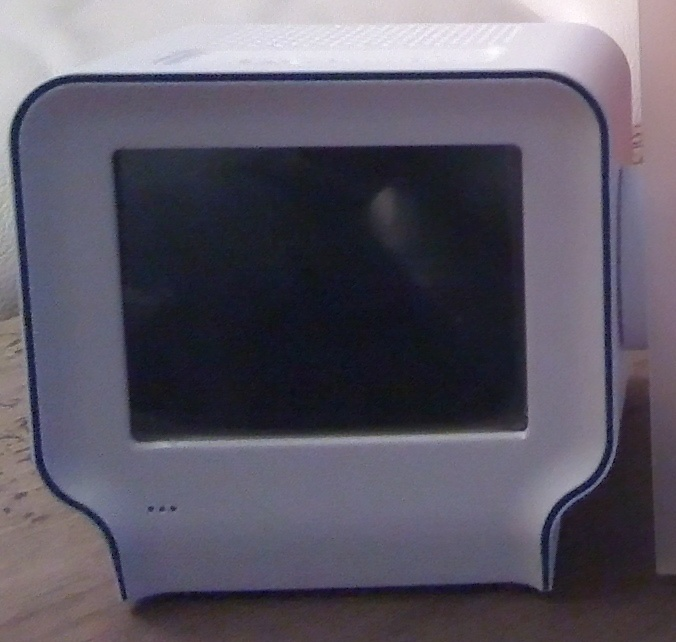
A Chumby One

Roughly resembling a small clock radio, the original Chumby features a small resistive touch-screen housed in a leather-and-plastic exterior with six color options. Power to the original Chumby and the Chumby 8 is supplied through an AC adapter. A later model, the Chumby One, also offered the option of a 9 V backup battery. Related devices, the Infocast 3.5 and Infocast 8, devices manufactured by Best Buy based on the Chumby software, are also only AC powered. The device is designed to be customizable by users: after agreeing to the Chumby HDK License, users may download schematics and other hardware information. Wired magazine named Chumby one of its top gadgets for 2008. Its software is mostly open source, running on Linux.

In 2012, Chumby ceased operation and was liquidated, with the assets being purchased by Duane Maxwell, the former Chief Technology Officer of Chumby Industries, who formed Blue Octy, LLC ("Blue Octy"). The server that was needed to keep the devices running was kept online as a full service by Blue Octy until March 2013. At that point, the server went offline and all devices only displayed a single widget, referred to as the "Space Clock." Blue Octy relaunched the full Chumby service on July 1, 2014 as a paid subscription service, currently charging US$3 per month.

== History ==
Andrew "bunnie" Huang was the lead hardware engineer at Chumby. The Chumby premiered on August 25, 2006 at Foo Camp and was released to around 100 alpha release testers at the event.

Shortly after Foo Camp, Chumby announced a free offer, where applicants would receive the same alpha-level Chumby as those previously given away. Applicants submitted ideas for software applications or hardware modifications. One of the goals for the free offer was to have Chumbys in the hands of developers who were willing to begin building applications.

In July 2007, a First 50 was released to 50 random applicants, who received the next generation of Chumbys. This was followed, in September, with an Insiders Release. Interested parties could send e-mail to Chumby requesting release information, and were given the opportunity to join in the Insiders Release. Finally, in February 2008, the commercial release was made public on the Chumby Store. In May 2008, the price was $179.95 for any one of three colors, latte, basic black, and pearl. In Japan, Chumby was available through Zyyx, Inc. as www.chumby.jp since October 23, 2008. In Australia, the Chumby was available through ISP Internode.

In November 2009 the Chumby One was released: a similar, all-plastic version of the original in white with blue trim. The major difference was the hard plastic case replacing the soft leather. Other changes include a slightly faster processor, only one USB port on the rear of the device, and inclusion of an FM tuner and physical volume knob. The hard plastic case allowed Chumby Industries to offer the Chumby One at a reduced price of $119.95.

In April 2012, Chumby announced the cessation of hardware sales, having ceased manufacture of their own hardware the previous year and exhausted their inventory. On April 20 it was confirmed that the company itself was being broken up. Dedicated fans managed to keep the service running for a period following the company's demise, but on 20 February 2013 Chumby shut down its servers, leaving users with a simple clock that shows time, calendar, and date. A brief message appears on the Chumby Web site, explaining the suspension of service.

On July 1, 2014, Blue Octy relaunched the Chumby service as a subscription-based platform.

In July 2017, Blue Octy undertook an effort to rescue the Sony Dash after Sony discontinued support for it. and by August 2017, a patch was released for the Sony Dash HID-C10 models to allow them to connect to the Blue Octy Chumby servers.

== Features ==
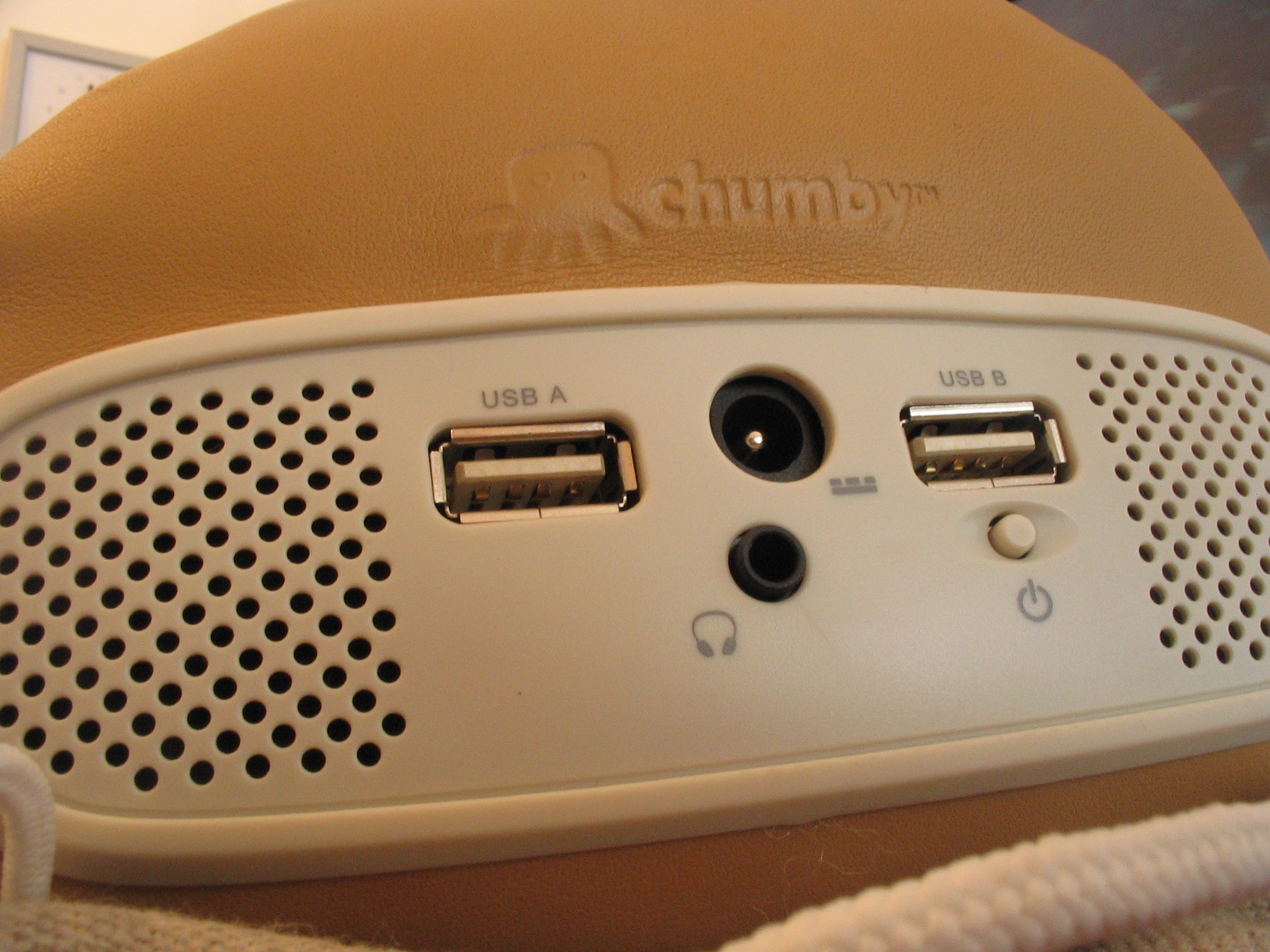
Close up of the rear of an original Chumby, showing the speakers, two USB ports, headphones jack, power button, and power port

=== Hardware ===
The Chumby is designed to be modified by users, with schematics, printed circuit board layouts and packaging/outerware designs available. Hardware specifications are as follows

The Original Chumby

- 350 MHz ARM9-based Freescale i.MX21 controller
- 64 MB of SDRAM
- 64 MB of NAND flash ROM
- 320×240 3.5 inch touchscreen TFT LCD running at 12 frames per second
- stereo 2-watt speakers, an audio output, an integrated microphone
- two USB 2.0 ports
- integrated Wi-Fi
- a bend sensor for squeeze-based user interface features
- motion sensor (accelerometer).

The Chumby One

- Freescale iMX233 454 MHz ARM926EJ-S processor
- 64 MB DDR SDRAM
- 2 GB internal microSD card (capacity depends on production date)
- 320×240 3.5-inch TFT color touchscreen
- 2 W mono speaker
- Wi-Fi connectivity (802.11 b/g)
- FM radio tuner
- Uses rechargeable lithium-ion battery (not included); about one hour on a full charge
- 4 in wide × 4 in tall × 3.5 in deep
- 1 USB 2.0 high-speed port
- Stereo headphone output
- Volume knob
- Accelerometer (motion sensor)
- ABS plastic housing
- AC adapter included
- USB Ethernet compatible
- Dimmable backlight

Comparison table

Comparison	Chumby One	Infocast 3.5	Original	Chumby 8	Infocast 8
Resolution	320×240	320×240		800x600	800x600
Screen	3.5"	3.5"	3.5"	8"	8"
Manage content channels from device					
Free subscriptions loaded and updated by Chumby	No	No		Yes	
Event scheduler UI	No	No		Yes	
Upload photos and videos to favorite photo-sharing sites	No	No		Yes	
External media support	Yes	Yes		SD, MMC, CF, USB	
Updated sharing features	No	No	Yes	Yes	
WebKit browser (chumbrowser)	No	No	Yes		
Accelerometer (motion sensor)	Yes			No	
USB port	1 USB 2.0 high speed port	1 USB 2.0 high speed port		2 USB 2.0 high speed ports	
FM radio tuner	Yes	Yes	No	No	No
Wi-Fi connectivity (802.11 b/g)	Yes	Yes	Yes	Yes	Yes
Processor	454 MHz ARM processor	454 MHz ARM processor	350 MHz ARM9	800 MHz Marvell ARMADA 166	Marvell Mohawk
RAM	64 MB DDR SDRAM	64 MB DDR SDRAM	64 MB DDR2 SDRAM	128 MB DDR2 SDRAM	128 MB DDR2 SDRAM
ROM	Internal microSD card firmware	Internal microSD card firmware	64 MB of NAND flash ROM	Internal 2 GB microSD flash storage	

==== Hacks ====
Hacking the Chumby hardware was encouraged by the manufacturer. Schematics and other hardware information may be downloaded after the user agrees to the Chumby HDK License. For example, users on the Chumby Forums have experimented with and documented some battery hacks, allowing the Chumby to be operated without AC power for short periods of time.

There also exists a Chumby Hacker Board that mostly resembles a Chumby One motherboard. There are some differences in hardware connectivity. Chumby Industries did not officially support the board.

=== Software ===
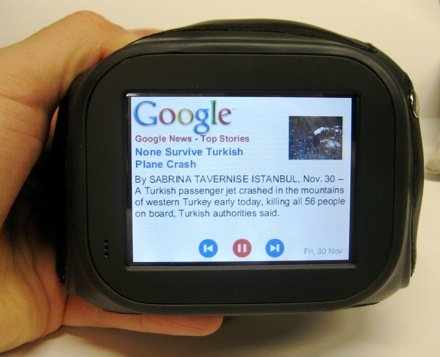
A Chumby being held and displaying a Google News story

Chumby units run a modified Linux kernel. The software originally installed on the device was designed to play a set of user-customizable widgets, small Adobe Flash animations that deliver real-time information. This is possible because an embedded version of Adobe Flash Player is installed. The animations have the ability to control and interact with the low-level hardware, thereby enabling functionality such as smart alarm clocks that bring the hardware out of sleep, a Web-based picture viewer, a Web-based camera, online RSS feeds, and physical user interface features, such as gesture recognition by squeezing the soft housing.

The software for the Chumby automatically updated when something new became available. The updates came from the free access to the Chumby network, and a modified BitTorrent client was used to upgrade the open-source portions of its firmware.

==== Multimedia limitations ====
Although the prototypes did not support video playback, all versions since May 2007 use Flash Lite 3 which allows for Sorenson, FLV, H.264, VP6 and On2 video playback.

== See also ==
- Amazon Echo Show
- JooJoo
