= XBR (Sony) =

Sony television line

XBR is a line of LCD, OLED, Plasma, Rear Projection, and CRT televisions produced by Sony. According to Sony, XBR is an acronym for eXtended Bit Rate, although there is evidence that it originally stood for "Project X, Black Remote" which was meant to distinguish it from the then-standard line of Sony televisions. The XBR range is typically derived from equipment that has been released in Japan and Europe as mid and high-end models, usually with some small upgrades. For example, in Europe and Japan, the Sony X-Series 1080p TVs had two HDMI inputs, whereas on the American XBR version, there were three. Some XBR televisions may cost up to US$25,000.

XBR models usually are denoted by a series number, particularly in the BRAVIA line.

- The KV-25XBR, circa 1985, is a 25" CRT monitor that shipped with two external 2-way speakers that could hang on the sides of the TV. It features a 4:3 aspect ratio and standard definition.
- KV-36XBR series (1990s to early 2000s) – 4:3 CRT with more than standard definition but less than high definition resolution, also available in 32" and 40" sizes. Some models are high definition
- KD-34XBR970 / KD-34XBR960 (early to mid 2000s) – 16:9 CRT TV, 34" diagonal, 720p/1080i high-definition Super Fine Pitch picture tube. HDMI input.
- KE-XBR900 / KDE-XBR950 (2003/2004) – 720p Plasma TV's with "Floating Glass" design where the bezel is surrounded by a glass frame. Available in 42", 50", 55" and 61" sizes. Native resolutions were 1024 x 768 for the 42", and 1366 x 768 for the 50" and up. 3-way speakers sit on each side of the display. Shipped with "Media Receiver Units" which was a separate component that housed the inputs. KDE-XBR950 models were one of the first plasma TV's to have built-in HDTV Tuners.
- KDL-XBR950 (2004) – 720p LCD with "Floating glass" design. Available in 32" and 42" sizes. Very similar to KE/KDE-XBR950 models except for being LCD's rather than Plasma displays. One of the early "Wega" LCD models produced before Sony introduced the Bravia line. Native resolutions were 1280 x 768 for the 32" and 1366 x 768 for the 42" screen. Also shipped with Media Receiver units.
- KDF-XBR950 (2004) 720p LCD Rear-Projection TV's. Available in 60" and 70" sizes. Native Resolution was 1386 x 788. Part of the Grand Wega line, which was Sony's line of RPTV's.
- KDS-XBR1/KDS-XBR2 (2005/2006) 1080p SXRD Rear Projection TV's. Available in 50", 60" and 70" sizes.
- XBR1 (2005) 720p LCD with a black bezel. Available in 26", 32" and 40" sizes. The viewing angle was adjustable on 26" and 32" models by swiveling or tilting the screen, similar to a monitor. Native resolution was 1366 x 768.
- XBR2 / XBR3 (2006) – 1080p LCD with "Floating Glass" design where the bezel is surrounded by a glass frame (XBR2 has a gray bezel and XBR3 has a piano black bezel)
- XBR4 / XBR5 (2007) – 1080p LCD with same "Floating Glass" design as previous XBR2/3 series and offers a 120-Hertz refresh rate (XBR4 has optional interchangeable color meshes and XBR5 has a piano black bezel)
- XBR6 (2008) – a 120-Hertz model featuring a floating customizable lower speaker, USB input, and DLNA photo player.
- XBR7 (2008) – a transitional series of models including a 52-inch 240-Hertz model and a mammoth 70-inch model. This series uses normal CCFL backlighting.
- XBR8 (2008) – a 120-Hertz model featuring the Triluminos LED backlighting. Unlike traditional LED-LCD displays the XBR8 used locally dimmed RGB LEDs vs. the standard white or blue LED. Floating customizable side speakers.
- XBR9 (2009) – a 240-Hertz model including enhanced DLNA capabilities and built in internet video features.
- XBR10 (Late 2009) – a 240 Hz thin LCD panel with LED edge-lighting and wireless 1080p connectivity via an included transmitter and receiver.
- XBRHX909 (2010) – 240 Hz, Full-Array LED backlighting with local dimming (Intelligent Dynamic LED), Internet streaming features, and optional Active RF 3D via a separate transmitter. The first model to incorporate Sony's "Monolith" design, wherein the TV is composed of a single pane of black glass. Available in 46-inch and 52-inch sizes.
- XBRLX900 (2010) – 240 Hz edge-lit LED with Monolith design. Included built-in wi-fi along with an integrated 3D transmitter and 2 pairs of active glasses. Also included a low-resolution camera that acted as a presence/proximity sensor. Available in 52-inch and 60-inch sizes.
- XBRHX929 (2011) – Featured streamlined Monolith design using Corning Gorilla Glass. 240 Hz refresh with Motionflow XR960 rating, Full-Array LED backlighting with local dimming (Intelligent Peak LED), presence sensor, X-Reality PRO image processing, Active 3D (RF). Available in 46-inch, 55-inch, and 65-inch sizes.
- XBRHX950 (2012) – Minor refresh of the HX929 with a newer, more rounded Monolith design and pedestal. Available in 55-inch and 65-inch.
- XBRX900A (84" version) (2012) – 84-inch 4K UHD (3840x2160 resolution) LED-edge-lit panel with local dimming. 240 Hz refresh rate with Motionflow XR960. Passive 3D with SimulView gaming, X-Reality PRO with XCA8-4K upscaling chip, detachable 50w speaker system. Sony includes a 4K media server and Xperia tablet remote control with this model.
- XBRX900A (2013) – 4K UHD resolution, 120 Hz/XR960, edge-lit LED with local dimming featuring TRILUMINOS quantum dot technology. Passive 3D with SimulView, 4K X-Reality PRO, non-detachable speaker system. Compatible with FMP-X1 4K Media Server (not included). Available in 55-inch and 65-inch. Upgradeable to HDMI 2.0 via firmware update.
- XBRX850A (2013) – 4K UHD resolution, TRILUMINOS quantum dot technology, 120 Hz/Motionflow XR960, edge-lit with local dimming LED. This model does not include the glass front or the speaker system of the X900A models. Includes HDMI 2.0 compliant and Active 3D. Available in 55 and 65 inches.
- XBRX850B (2014) – 4K UHD resolution, Triluminos, HEVC for 4K streaming, PlayStation Now ready, Frame Dimming, 3D: Passive (49, 55, 65), Active (70). Available in 49", 55", 65", and 70".
- XBRX900B (2014) – 4K UHD resolution, Triluminos, HEVC for 4K streaming, PlayStation Now ready, X-Tended Dynamic Range (edge-lit local dimming), Wedge (tapering) design with side-mounted magnetic fluid speakers, 3D: Active (55", 65"), Passive (79"). Available in 55", 65", and 79".
- XBRX950B (2014) – 4K UHD resolution, Triluminos, HEVC for 4K streaming, PlayStation Now ready, X-Tended Dynamic Range Pro (Full-Array LED backlight with local dimming), Active 3D. Available in 65" and 85".
- XBRX830C (2015) – 4K, Android TV with Google Cast built-in, new X1 Processor, Motionflow XR960. Available in 43" and 49".
- XBRX850C (2015) – 4K, Android TV with Google Cast built-in, X1 Processor, Triluminos, Frame Dimming, Voice control remote, Motionflow XR960, Active 3D. 55" (edge-lit), 65", and 75" (direct-lit).
- XBRX900C/XBRX910C (2015) – 4K, Android TV with Google Cast built-in, X1 Processor, Triluminos, Voice control remote, Motionflow XR960, 0.2" thin edge-to-edge panel with included flush mount, Passive 3D. 55", 65", 75".
- XBRX930C (2015) – 4K, Android TV with Google Cast built-in, X1 Processor, Triluminos, Voice control remote, Motionflow XR1440, X-Tended Dynamic Range (edge-lit with local dimming), High Dynamic Range (HDR) support, half-wedge design with side-mounted magnetic fluid speakers, Active 3D. 65".
- XBRX940C (2015) – 4K, Android TV with Google Cast built-in, X1 Processor, Triluminos, Voice control remote, Motionflow XR1440, X-Tended Dynamic Range Pro (FUll-array LED backlight with local dimming), High Dynamic Range (HDR) support, half-wedge design with side-mounted magnetic fluid speakers, Active 3D. 75".
- XBRX850D (2016) – 4K UHD resolution, Android TV, X1 Processor, Triluminos Display, 4K X-Reality Pro, High Dynamic Range (HDR) support, Motionflow XR800, Available in 55", 65", 75", 85".
- XBRX930D (2016) – 4K resolution, Android TV, X1 Processor, Triluminos Display, High Dynamic Range (HDR) support, X-tended Dynamic Range, Motionflow XR1000, Available in 55", 65".
- XBRX940D (2016) – 4K resolution, Android TV, X1 Processor, Triluminos Display, High Dynamic Range (HDR) support, X-tended Dynamic Range, Motionflow XR1200, Available in 75".
- XBRX800E (2017) – 4K UHD resolution, Android TV, X1 Processor, Triluminos Display, 4K X-Reality Pro, High Dynamic Range (HDR) support, Motionflow XR240, Available in 43", 49", 55".
- XBRX850E (2017) – 4K UHD resolution, Android TV, X1 Processor, Triluminos Display, 4K X-Reality Pro, High Dynamic Range (HDR) support, Motionflow XR960, Available in 65", 75".
- XBRX900E (2017) – 4K UHD resolution, Android TV, X1 Processor, Triluminos display, 4K X-Reality Pro, High Dynamic Range (HDR) support, Motionflow XR960, X-tended Dynamic Range, Available in 49", 55", 65", 75".
- XBRX930E/XBRX940E (2017) – 4K UHD resolution, Android TV, X1 Extreme Processor, Triluminos Display, 4K X-Reality Pro, High Dynamic Range (HDR) support, Motionflow XR960, X-tended Dynamic Range, Available in 55", 65", 75".
