= Sony Dash =

Personal internet viewer

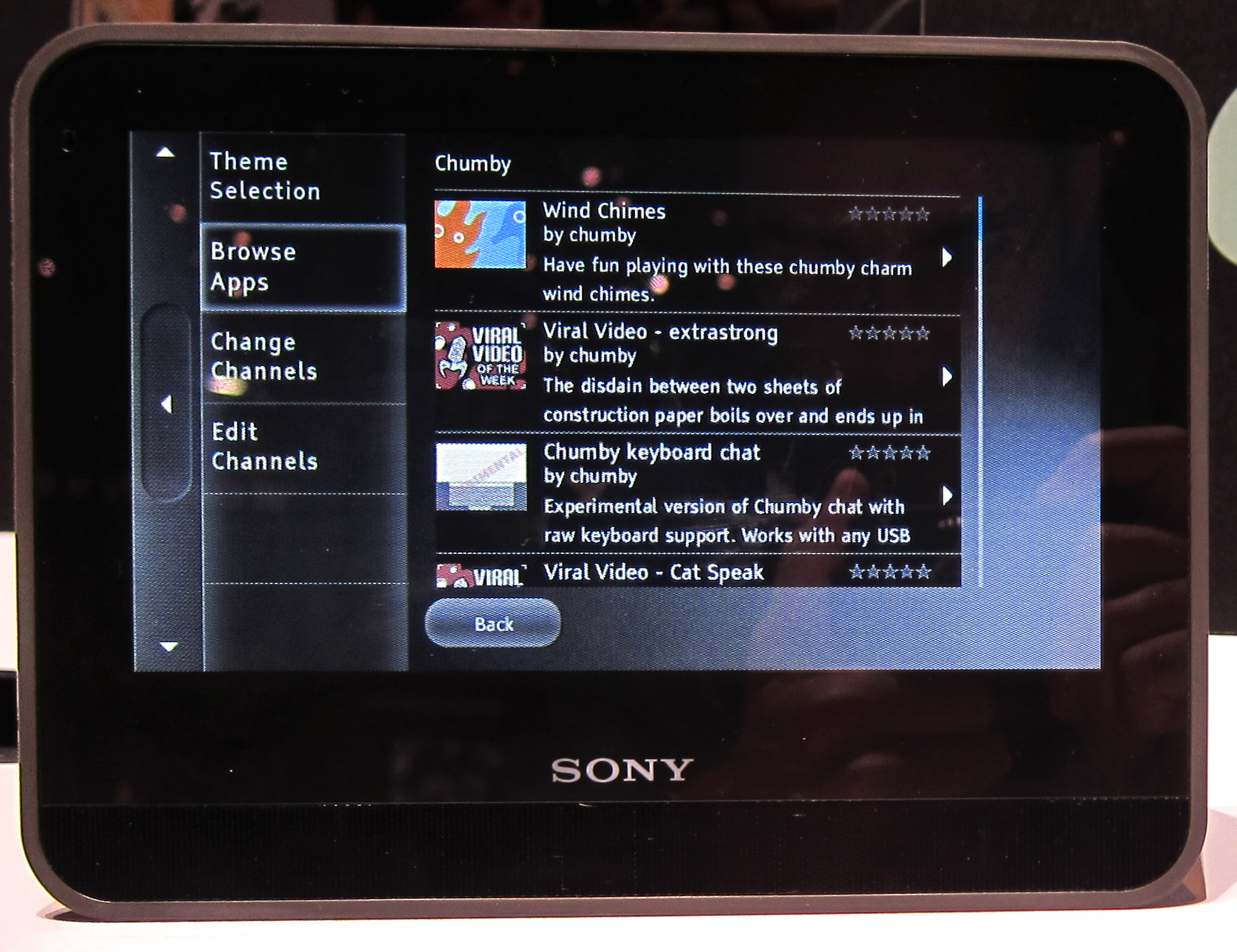
- Sony Dash at the 2010 Consumer Electronics Show.
- Manufacturer: Sony Electronics
- Introductory price: $199
- Operating system: Modified Chumby software
- Storage: No user accessible memory
- Display: WVGA resolution (800x480) 7.0" (measured diagonally)
- Sound: Stereo speakers; variable output headphone jack
- Input: Microphone, accelerometer, digital ambient light sensor USB 2.0 (Mass Storage Class)
- Camera: None
- Touchpad: Projected capacitive single-touch touchscreen
- Connectivity: Wi-Fi : 802.11b/g, 2.4 GHz WPA, WPA2, WEP(Open only) encryption WiFi certified
- Power: AC 120 V, 0.6 A,60 Hz, battery only functions as clock backup
- Dimensions: Approx. 7-7/16 x 5-5/8 x 2-3/8" (WHD)
- Weight: Approx. 1.2 lbs (.54 kg)
- Related: Walkman X Series; Sony Reader; Chumby

The Sony Dash (occasionally stylized as Sony dash) was a digital alarm clock and internet-connected device manufactured by Sony, in partnership with Chumby. It had a touch screen which the user could use to browse information or listen to music. It was positioned as a personal internet viewer, with expandable capabilities through the use of widgets.

== History ==
Sony announced the Dash at the 2010 Consumer Electronics Show. It was made available for sale in late April 2010. Originally the device was only usable in the United States, with users in other countries being locked out with the message "Error: Missing XAPI Service Mode". On June 25, Sony released a software upgrade allowing Dash to be used in other (if not all) countries, however subsequently restricted international service again in November 2011. The device does not have international power settings, and can only be powered by mains electricity of 120 volts, at 60 Hz, though this was confirmed false by different foreign users online, that the power adapter is able to work in 220 volts, requiring only the plug adapter.

Sony introduced two updated versions of the Dash hardware in September 2011. The HID-B7 and HID-B70 refreshed the hardware, with the HID-B70 adding a battery backup. This revision of the Dash device removed Netflix and YouTube streaming support.

On March 14, 2015 the Sony Dash stopped supporting all streaming content, including Netflix, Pandora, Slacker, and YouTube, although the device continued to authenticate with Sony and act as an alarm clock. While there was no public response from the company, such service returned on April 24, 2015.

As of March 2016, Sony continued to provide limited support for the Dash, such as promised fixes for a leap year issue and a firmware update to address a problem with the control panel.

In April 2017, Sony announced that it "will no longer support dash devices and functionality will terminate" as of July 2017.

Chumby has initiated a program to try to offer continued support after Sony discontinued service.

Chumby released their Dash patch on August 6, 2017 to allow Dashes to connect with the Chumby servers.

== Public reception ==
Public reception to the Sony dash was mixed, with most positive feedback coming to the conclusion that it was a fun, but not necessarily practical, device. Negative feedback was mainly centered around the UI and speed of the device, with some criticizing its usefulness.

It was listed in Mumbai Mirror's "The best of CES 2010" article, received "Recommended Product" status from Digital Trends, and received Engadget's "Fourth Screen Award for Best New Home Internet Appliance" Switchies Award.

Tech columnist David Pogue stated that the Sony Dash was neither quick nor satisfying. David Carnoy of CNET called it "a good move for Sony, though [I]'d like to see the Dash shave a few bucks off its list price." PCMag's review indicated that "As a template for the alarm clock of the future, the Dash succeeds, but when it attempts to be an entertainment hub, it falls a bit short."

== Legal action ==
A class action lawsuit was filed by Richard Grisafi in 2020, alleging that Sony's "always-on" marketing was false and misleading, and that "The SONY Dash was only functional for a commercially unreasonable time." The lawsuit was settled in 2021 for 1.6 million dollars, with each plaintiff eligible for up to $35.

== Notes ==
- Chen, Brian X (January 7, 2010). "Hands-Off With the Sony Dash Touchscreen Frame". Wired.
- CES: Will Sony work well with others? EETimes
- Meet the Sony Dash: The Latest Tablet to Debut at CES Network World
