= Unimatic =

Flight data system used by United Airlines

Unimatic is a computer system used by United Airlines since the 1970s to track and disburse vital flight data such as scheduling, aircraft weight, and aircraft balance. A massive failure of the system early on 8 August 2025 led to 35% of all United flights being delayed and 7% cancelled throughout the United States, with concomitant effects internationally. Furthermore, the FAA issued an alert cancelling all United flights to O'Hare International Airport; as of 8:45 p.m. CDT, United flights departing from there were delayed an average of two hours. Ground stops were necessitated in Newark, Denver, Houston, and other airline hubs as well as in Chicago. United averred that it was not a cybersecurity incident and that it was a "controllable situation", with passengers being compensated.
