= JVC HR-3300 =

World's first VHS-based VCR

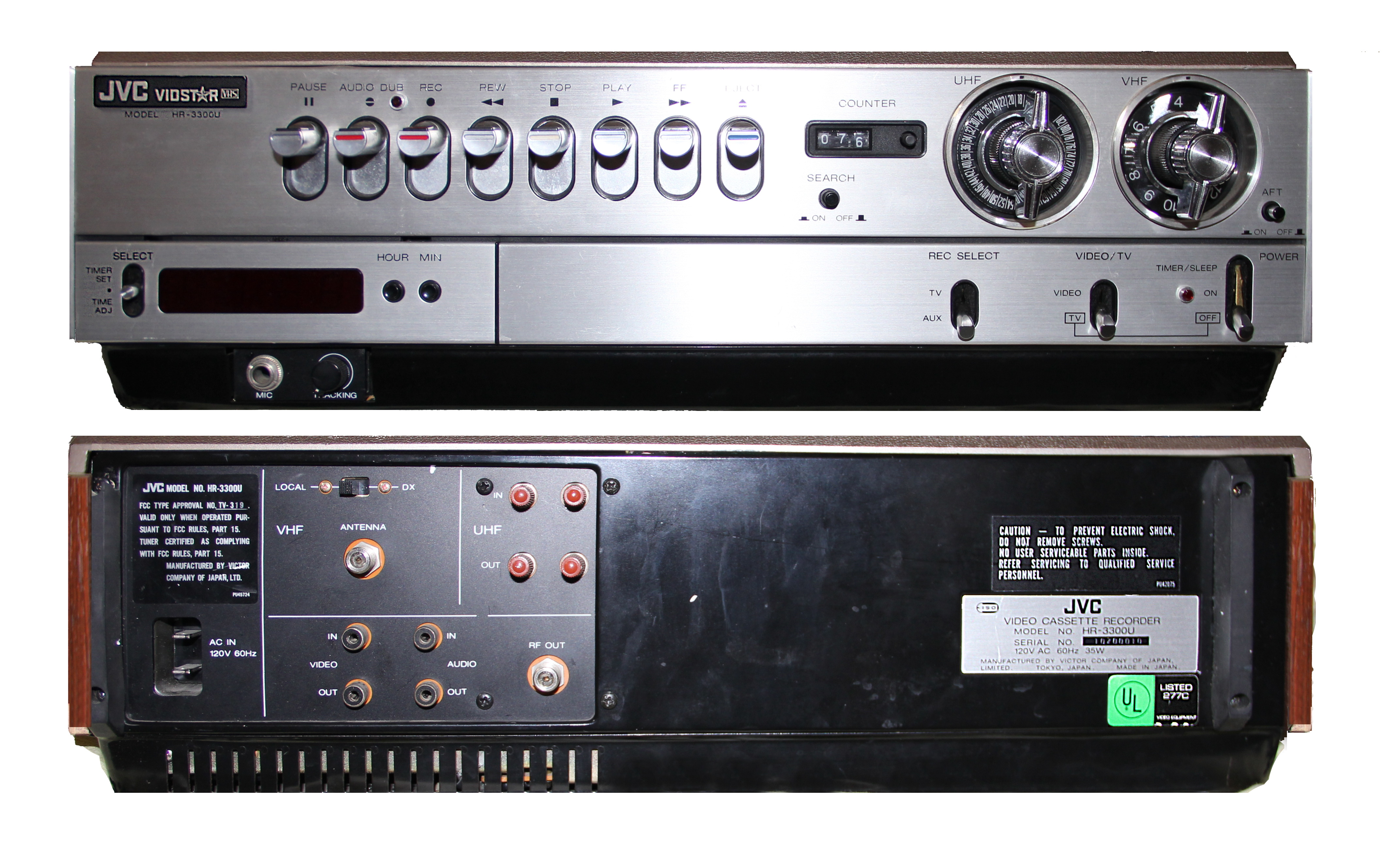
JVC HR-3300U VIDSTAR - the United States version of the JVC HR-3300. It is virtually identical to the Japan version. Japan's version showed the "Victor" name, and didn't use the "VIDSTAR" name.

The JVC HR-3300 VIDSTAR is the world's first VHS-based VCR to be released to the market, introduced by the president of JVC at the Okura Hotel on September 9, 1976. Sales started in Japan under the name Victor HR-3300 on 31 October 1976. Foreign sales followed in 1977 with the HR-3300U in the United States, and HR-3300EK in the United Kingdom.

In 2008, the HR-3300 became the first VCR to be registered with the National Museum of Nature and Science, based in Tokyo, Japan. It was noted as one of the 85 most disruptive ideas by Business Week in 2014.

== History ==
=== Prior efforts ===
The first video recording system sold directly to home consumers was the 1963 1/4-inch open reel Telcan from the UK, but this was not a commercial success. Sony's CV-2000 was a complete system based on commercial 1/2-inch tape on open reels, requiring the user to thread the tape around the helical scan heads. In order to conserve tape, the system recorded every other field of the television signal, producing half-resolution output. Similar models from Ampex and RCA followed that year. The number of video tape recorders continued to increase during the late 1960s, leading to the EIAJ-1 standard for 1/2-inch tape on a 7 inch reel. The follow-up EIAJ-2 built the take-up reel into the recorder body.

In September 1971, Sony introduced the U-matic format, aimed at professional users, which replaced the open reels with a cassette. The next year Philips introduced the Video Cassette Recording format specifically for home users. Over the next five years, a number of companies introduced similar cassette-based home formats, all of which were incompatible. Among the better known examples are Sanyo's V-Cord from 1974, Sony's Betamax from 1975, and Panasonic's VX from 1975.

=== VHS ===
JVC engineers Yuma Shiraishi and Shizuo Takano led the effort in developing the VHS tape format starting in 1971. The project started off by designing guidelines for VHS, creating a matrix on a blackboard called the VHS Development Matrix. Included in the matrix was a list of objectives in building a home video recording unit. The HR-3300 is a result of these objectives.

Soon after the matrix was produced, the commercial video recording industry in Japan took a financial hit. As a result, JVC cut its budgets and restructured its video division - even going as far as shelving the VHS project. However, despite the lack of funding for the VHS project, Takano and Shiraishi continued to work on the project in secrecy within the video division. By 1973, the two engineers successfully produced a functional prototype of the HR-3300.

=== Release ===
The first HR-3300 was released in 1976. These early units used two large rotary knobs for tuning television signals for recording, one for VHF and another for UHF. Separate antenna inputs and pass-throughs were provided for both frequencies, as well composite video in and out via RCA jacks. An electronic timer with four seven-segment displays was located in the lower left of the front panel allowed the user to automatically record programs, one event up to 24 hours in the future. It also included a mechanical three-digit counter, similar to those on audio cassette recorders.

For the US and UK release the next year, the system was updated by replacing the mechanical tuning dials with a push-button system with eight pre-selected channels. A panel in the top flipped up to access small mechanical tuning dials for each of the eight channels. Push-button tuning was relatively rare at this time. The UK model was also released under the Ferguson brand name.

=== Format war ===
In December 1974, Sony attempted to standardize their Betamax format by inviting Matsushita (Panasonic) and JVC to license the system. Apparently to their surprise, both companies refused. At the time, Matsushita not only sold through its own Panasonic brand, but was the majority shareholder in JVC as well. Through 1976 Sony was unrivalled in the VCR market, selling 30,000 units in the US alone.

The HR-3300 was introduced late in 1976 with one crucial feature, the ability to hold two hours of video on a single cassette. This made the format able to record an entire movie. JVC licensed the VHS format as an open standard, and in January 1977 there were VHS products from four other Japanese companies on the market.

In February Sony once again started to look for licensors for the Betamax format, and joined forces with US-based Zenith Electronics. Matsushita then started looking for US partners as well, and formed an alliance with RCA. RCA was interested, but stated that the format should be extended to allow recordings of five to six hours. JVC refused to compromise on picture quality by slowing down the tape speed, but Matsushita produced a prototype of such a system, and RCA announced they were going with VHS in March 1977. Simply re-badging units made by Matsushita in Japan, by 1978, RCA held 36% of the VCR market, and VHS was on its way to becoming a de facto standard.

== Specifications ==
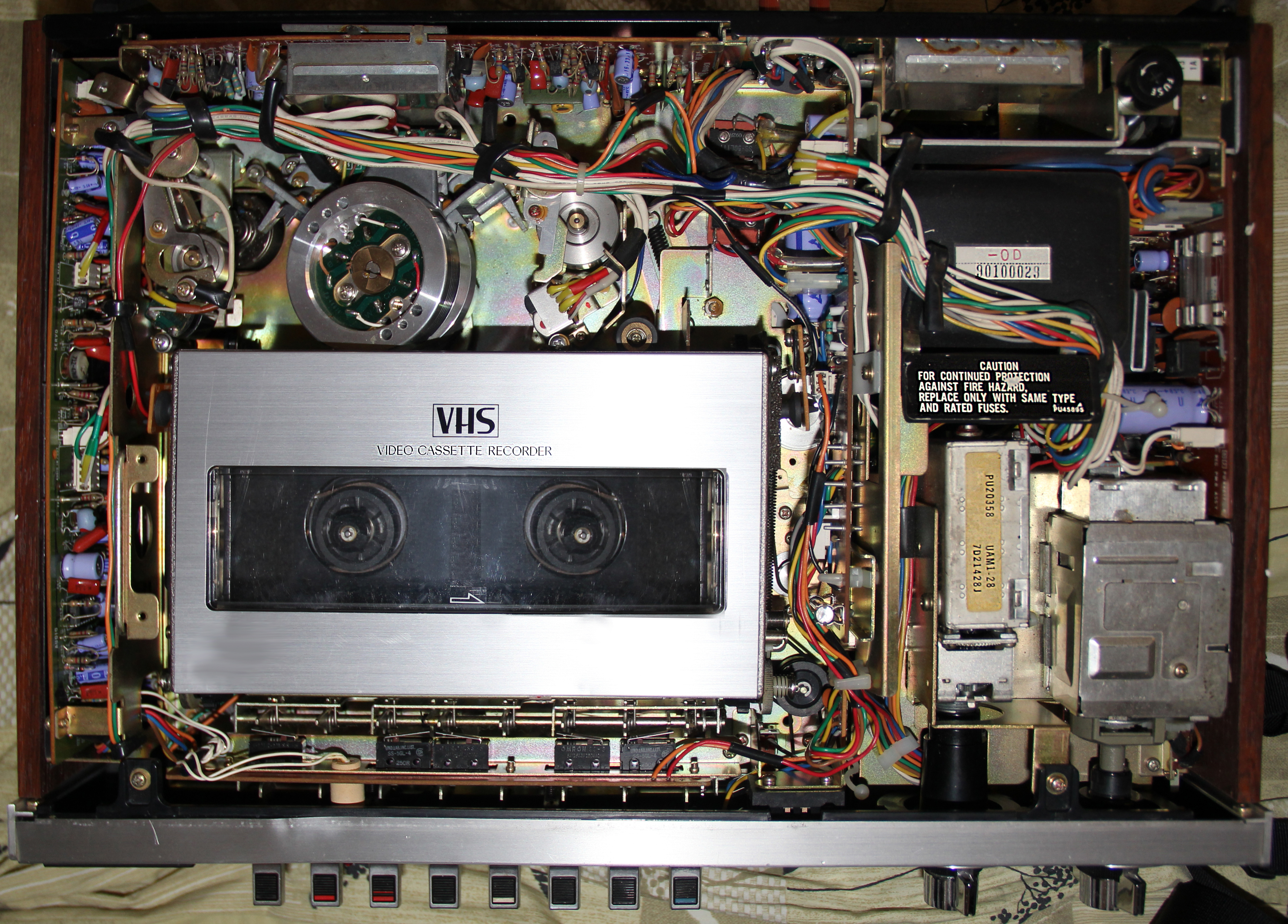
Inside the JVC HR-3300U.

Being the very first VHS-based VCR, the HR-3300 is the result of the VHS Development Matrix in terms of ease of servicing. Almost every component of this VCR can be purchased at any electronic surplus store.

Format	VHS standard
Recording system	Rotary, slant azimuth two-head helical scan system
Video signal system	NTSC-type color signal
Tape width	12.7 mm (0.5 inches)
Tape speed	33.35 mm/s (1.31 ips)
Maximum recording time	120 min. with T-120 cassette
Power requirements	120 VAC, 60 Hz
Power consumption	28 watts, or 35 watts when automatic thermal heating is activated
Video
Input	0.5 to 2.0 Vp-p, 75 ohms unbalanced
Output	1.0 Vp-p, 75 ohms unbalanced
Signal-to-noise ratio	More than 42 dB
Horizontal resolution	More than 220 lines (color mode)
Audio
Input	Mic: -67 dB
	10 k-ohms unbalanced
	Line: -20 dB
	50 k-ohms unbalanced
Output level	0 dB, high impedance load
Output impedance	1 k-ohm, unbalanced
Signal-to-noise ratio	More than 40 dB
Frequency response	50 Hz to 10,000 Hz
Dimensions	45.3 cm(W) x 14.7 cm(H) x 33.7 cm (D)
Weight	13.5 kg (30 lbs)

== Rebadged versions ==
JVC made VHS machines for other companies as well, multiple companies such as Akai, Nordmende and Telefunken rebranded this unit. Here is a list of rebranded models.

- Akai VS-9300EG
- Baird 8900
- Ferguson 3V22
- Ferguson 3V00
- Ferguson 3292
- Nordmende 0.460 H
- Saba VR-2000, later sold as VR-6000 with minor cosmetic difference.
- Telefunken VR400
- Thorn 8903
