= Portapak =

Portable video tape analog recording system introduced in 1967

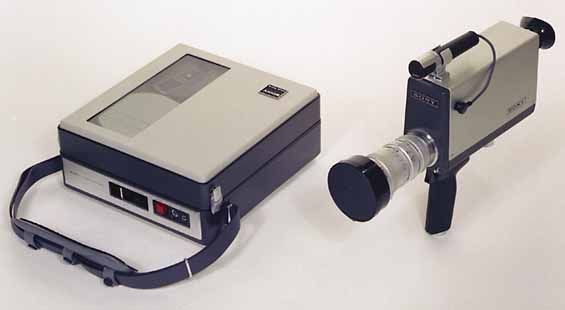
- A Sony DV-2400 Portapak
- Media type: Magnetic tape
- Encoding: NTSC, PAL
- Developed by: Sony
- Usage: Home movies

A Portapak is a battery-powered, self-contained video tape analog recording system. Introduced to the market in 1967, it could be carried and operated by one person.

Earlier television cameras were large and heavy, required a specialized vehicle for transportation, and were mounted on a pedestal. The Portapak made it possible to shoot and record video easily outside of the studio without requiring a crew. Although it recorded at a lower quality than television studio cameras, the Portapak was adopted by both professionals and amateurs as a new method of video recording. Before Portapak cameras, remote television news footage was routinely photographed on 16mm film and telecined for broadcast.

The first portapak system, the Sony DV-2400 Video Rover, was a two-piece set consisting of a black-and-white composite video video camera and a separate record-only helical scan ½″ video tape recorder (VTR) unit. It required a Sony CV series VTR (such as the CV-2000) to play back the video. Following Sony's introduction of the Video Rover, numerous other manufacturers sold their own versions of Portapak technology. Although it was light enough for a single person to carry and use, it was usually operated by a crew of two: one carrying and controlling the camera, and one carrying and operating the VTR.

This model was followed up by the AV-3400/AVC-3400, which used the EIAJ-1 format and had 30-minute capacity, as well as playback capability. Later Portapaks by Sony, JVC, and others used such formats as U-Matic videocassettes (with reduced-size 20-minute U-Matic S cassettes) and Betacam SP (for which a Portapak, unlike a camera-mounted deck, allowed the use of the larger L cassettes, for up to 90-minute recording time).

The introduction of the Portapak had a great influence on the development of video art, guerrilla television, and activism. Video collectives such as TVTV and the Videofreex utilized Portapak technology to document countercultural movements apart from the Big Three television networks. The Portapak was also a crucial technology for the Raindance Foundation, a collective consisting of artists, academics, and scientists, motivated by the potential of the Portapak and video to develop alternative forms of communication. Because of its relative affordability and immediate playback capability, the Portapak provided artists, experimenters, and social commentators the ability to make and distribute videos apart from well-funded production companies.

A generation whose childhood had been dominated by broadcast television was now able to get its hands on a means of TV production. The machine was relatively inexpensive ($1,500), light- weight, easy to use and reliable, and it produced a decent black-and-white image with acceptable audio. Tape was reusable and inexpensive. The video portapak helped trigger a range of activity linking video with social change.

The Portapak would seem to have been invented specifically for use by artists. Just when pure formalism had run its course; just when it became politically embarrassing to make objects, but ludicrous to make nothing; just when many artists were doing performance works but had nowhere to perform, or felt the need to keep a record of their performances; just when it began to seem silly to ask the same old Berkleean question, ‘If you build a sculpture in the desert where no one can see it, does it exist?’; just when it became clear that TV communicates more information to more people than large walls do; just when we understood that in order to define space it is necessary to encompass time; just when many established ideas in other disciplines were being questioned and new models were proposed — just then the Portapak became available.

== See also ==
- CCJ connector
