= Video tape recorder =

Device for recording video and audio on magnetic tape

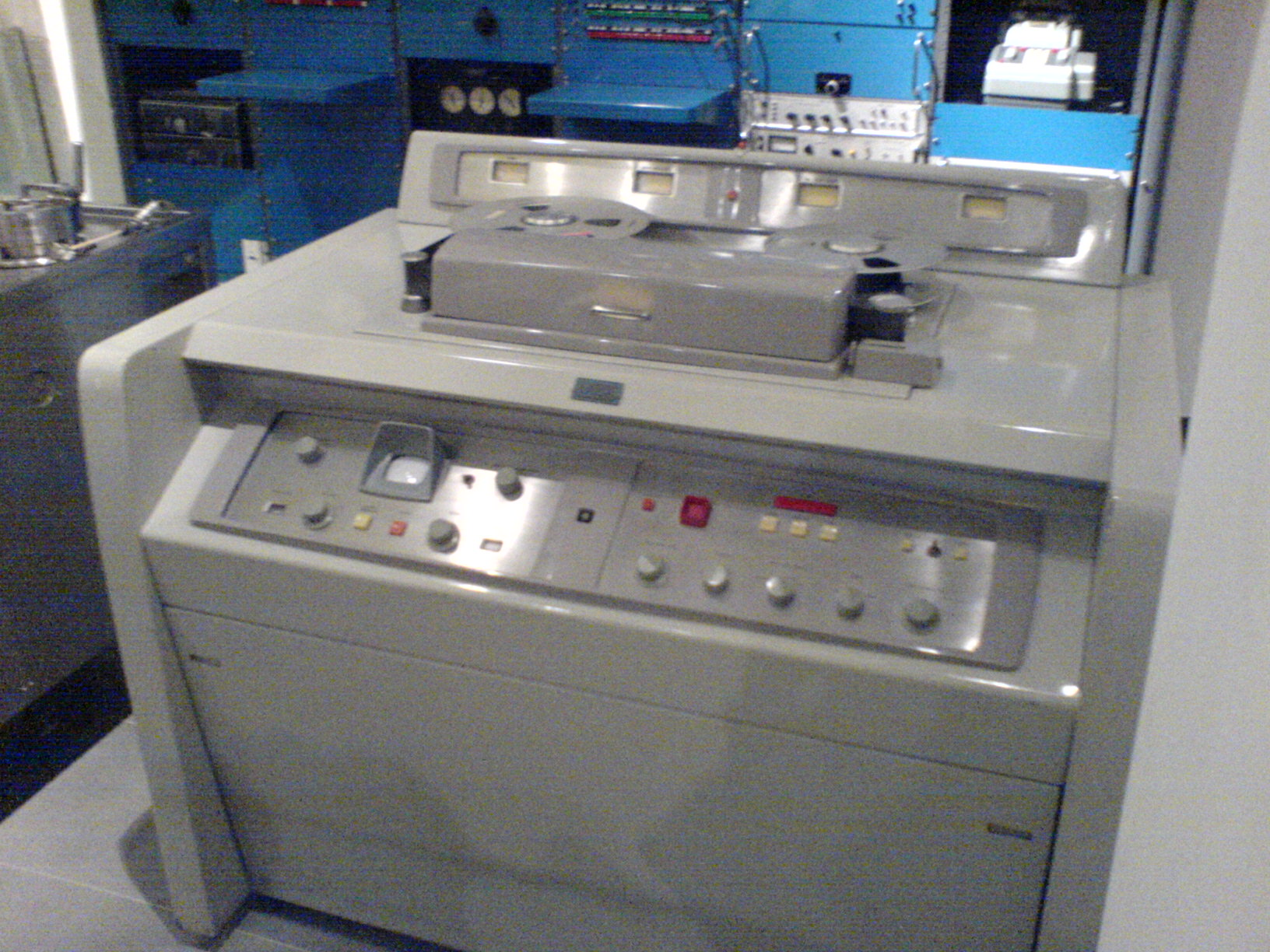
AMPEX quadruplex VR-1000A, the first commercially released video tape recorder in the late 1950s; quadruplex open-reel tape is 2 inches wide

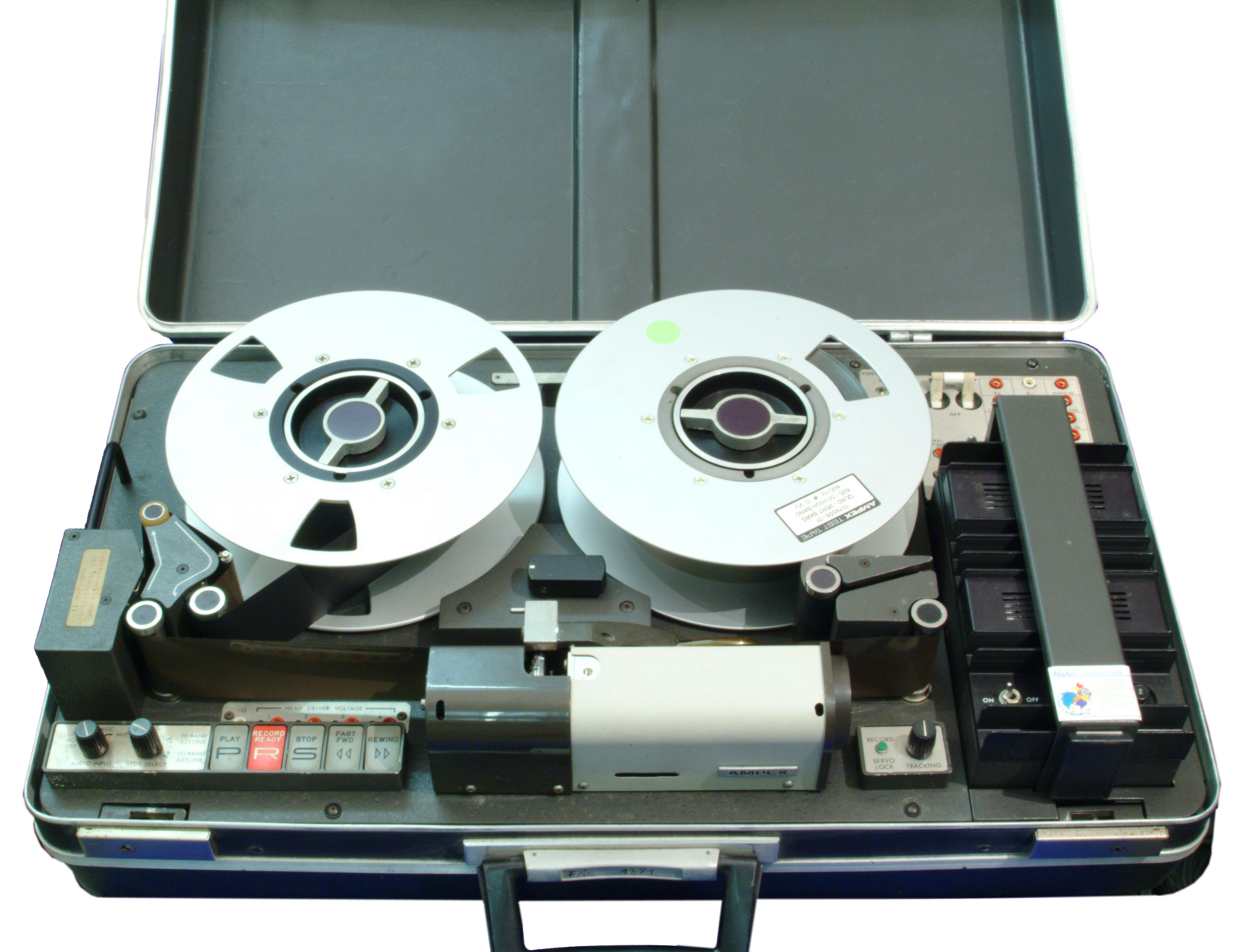
The first portable VTR, the suitcase-sized 1967 AMPEX quadruplex VR-3000

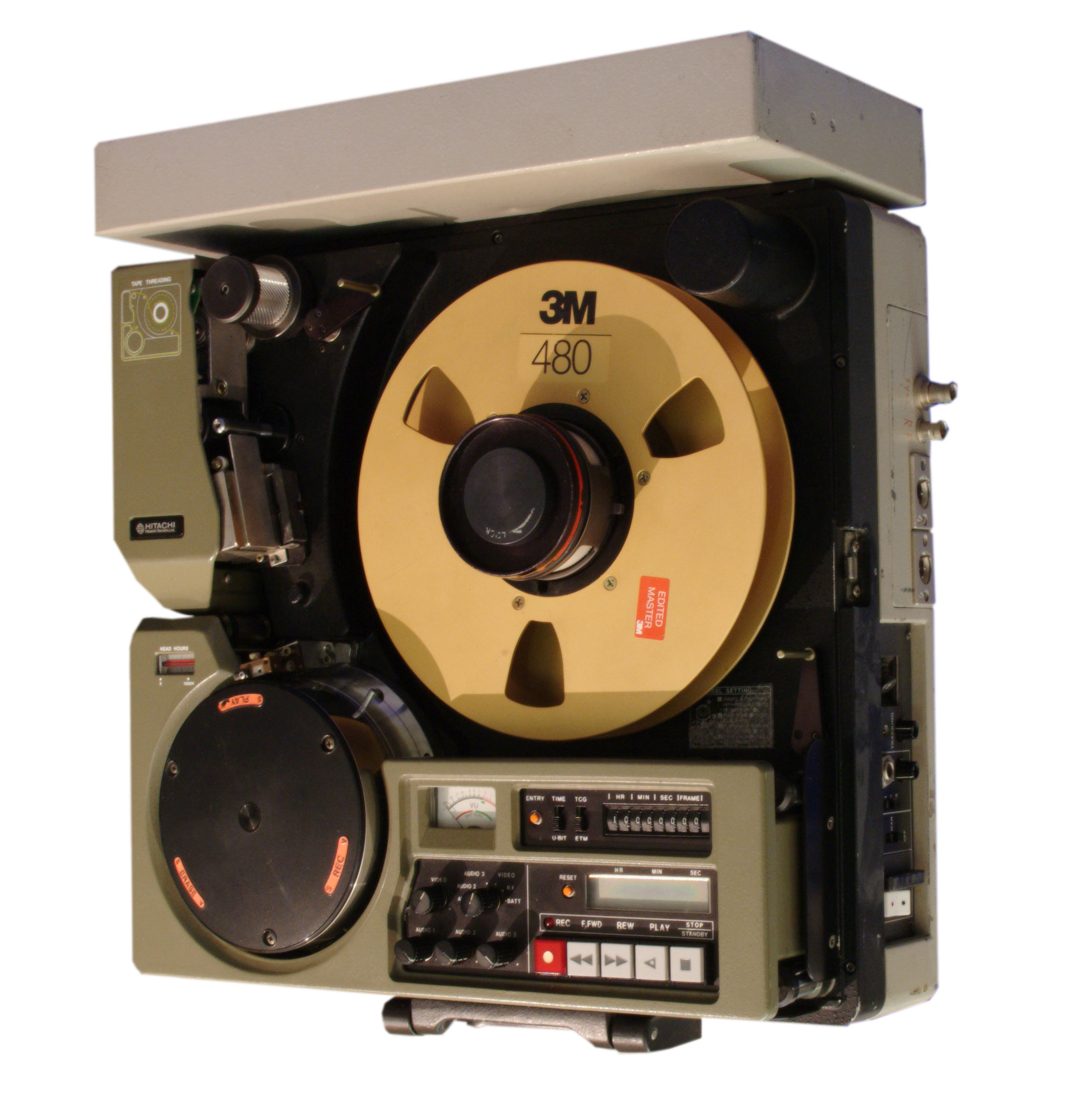
1976 Hitachi portable VTR, for Sony 1" type C; the source and take-up reels are stacked for compactness. However, only one reel is shown here.

A video tape recorder (VTR) is a tape recorder designed to record and play back video and audio material from magnetic tape. The early VTRs were open-reel devices that record on individual reels of 2-inch-wide (5.08 cm) video tape. They were used in television studios, serving as a replacement for motion picture film stock and making recording for television applications cheaper and quicker. Beginning in 1963, videotape machines made instant replay during televised sporting events possible. Improved formats, in which the tape was contained inside a videocassette, were introduced around 1969; the machines that play them are called videocassette recorders.

An agreement by Japanese manufacturers on a common standard recording format, which allowed cassettes recorded on one manufacturer's machine to play on another's, made a consumer market possible. The first consumer videocassette recorder, which used the U-matic format, was introduced by Sony in 1971.

== History ==
In early 1951, the popular singer Bing Crosby—who had also been closely involved in the development and commercialization of audiotape technology, through a personal company—asked an employee, electrical engineer John T. (Jack) Mullin, whether television could also be recorded on tape. Mullin said he thought that it could be done. Bing asked Ampex to build one and also set up a laboratory for Mullin in Bing Crosby Enterprises (BCE) to build one. In 1951, it was believed that if the tape was run at a very high speed, it could provide the necessary bandwidth to record the video signal. The problem was that a video signal has a much wider bandwidth than an audio signal does (6 MHz vs 20 kHz), requiring extremely high tape speeds to record it. However, there was another problem: the magnetic head design would not permit bandwidths over 1 megahertz to be recorded regardless of the tape speed.

The first efforts at video recording, using recorders similar to audio recorders with fixed heads, were unsuccessful. The first such demonstration of this technique was done by BCE on November 11, 1951. The result was a very poor picture. Another of the early efforts was the Vision Electronic Recording Apparatus (VERA), a high-speed multi-track machine developed by the BBC in 1952. This machine used a thin steel tape on a 21-inch (53.5 cm) reel traveling at over 200 inches (510 cm) per second. Despite 10 years of research and improvements, it was never widely used due to the immense length of tape required for each minute of recorded video.

By 1952, BCE also had moved on to multi-track machines, but found limitations in recording bandwidth even at the high speeds. In 1953, BCE discovered that the magnetic head design was the problem. This problem was corrected, and bandwidths exceeding the 1 megahertz limit were able to be recorded. Since BCE and AMPEX were working together on the video recorder, the new head design was shared with them, and AMPEX used it in their recorder. In 1955, BCE demonstrated a broadcast-quality color recorder that operated at 100 inches per second, and CBS ordered three of them. Many other fixed-head recording systems were tried, but all required an impractically high tape speed. It became clear that practical video recording technology depended on finding some way of recording the wide-bandwidth video signal without the high tape speed required by linear-scan machines.

In 1953, Eduard Schüller of Telefunken patented the helical scan technology. Another solution was transverse-scan technology, developed by Ampex around 1954, in which the recording heads are mounted on a spinning drum and record tracks in the transverse direction, across the tape. By recording on the full width of the tape rather than just a narrow track down the center, this technique achieved a much higher density of data per linear centimeter of tape, allowing a lower tape speed of 15 inches per second to be used. The Ampex VRX-1000 became the world's first commercially successful videotape recorder in 1956. It uses the 2″ quadruplex format, using two-inch (5.1 cm) tape. Because of its US$50,000 price, the Ampex VRX-1000 could be afforded only by the television networks and the largest individual stations.

By early 1957, the only successful manufacturer of videotape was 3M, the product being exceedingly difficult to manufacture to the necessary quality. The three U.S. networks officially inaugurated use of videotape on April 28, 1957, "with the changeover to daylight saving time," at which time there were "probably not more than 50 useable rolls of tape among them—it was that critical."

Ampex's quadruplex magnetic tape video recording system has certain limitations, such as the lack of clean pause, or still-frame, capability, because when tape motion is stopped, only a single segment of the picture recording is present at the playback heads (only 16 lines of the picture in each segment), so it can only reproduce recognizable pictures when the tape is playing at normal speed.) But in spite of its drawbacks, it remained the broadcasting studio standard until about 1980. The helical scan system overcame this limitation.

In 1959, JVC demonstrated its first helical scan VTR named KV-1. In 1963, Philips introduced its EL3400 1" helical scan recorder (aimed at the business and domestic user), and Sony marketed the 2" PV-100, its first open-reel VTR intended for business, medical, airline, and educational use.

The Telcan, produced by the Nottingham Electronic Valve Company and demonstrated on June 24, 1963, was the first home video recorder. It could be bought as a unit or in kit form for £60. However, there were several drawbacks: it was expensive, not easy to put together, and could record for only 20 minutes at a time in black-and-white.

The Sony model CV-2000, first marketed in 1965, is their first VTR intended for home use and is based on half-inch tape. Ampex and RCA followed in 1965 with their own open-reel monochrome VTRs priced under US$1,000 for the home consumer market. Prerecorded videos for home replay became available in 1967.

The EIAJ format is a standard half-inch format used by various manufacturers. EIAJ-1 is an open-reel format. EIAJ-2 uses a cartridge that contains a supply reel, but not the take-up reel. Since the take-up reel is part of the recorder, the tape has to be fully rewound before removing the cartridge, which is a relatively slow procedure.

The development of the videocassette followed other replacements of open-reel systems with a cassette or cartridge in consumer items: the Stereo-Pak 4-track audio cartridge in 1962, the compact audio cassette and Instamatic film cartridge in 1963, the 8-track cartridge in 1965, and the Super 8 home motion picture film cartridge in 1966. Before the invention of the video tape recorder, live video was recorded onto motion picture film stock in a process known as telerecording or kinescoping. Although the first quadruplex VTRs recorded with good quality, the recordings could not be slowed or freeze-framed, so kinescoping processes continued to be used for about a decade after the development of the first VTRs.

== Technology ==
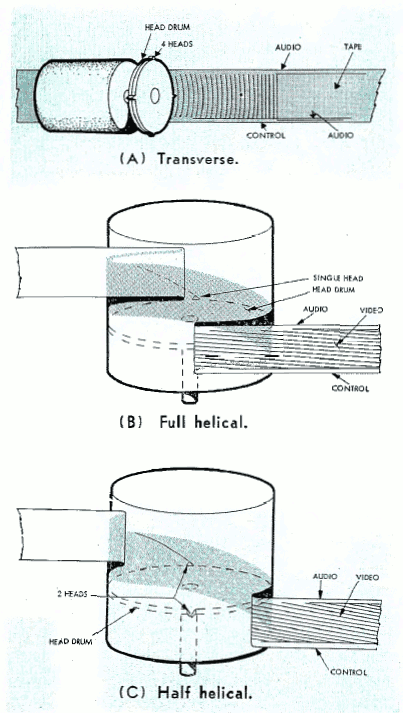
Scanning techniques used in video tape recorders. (A) Transverse scanning used in the early quadriplex system requires several vertical tracks to record a video frame. (B) Helical scan, by recording in long diagonal tracks, is able to fit a full video field onto each track. The first full-helical system uses one head, requiring tape to wrap fully around the drum. (C) Half-helical system with 2 heads only requires tape to wrap 180° around the drum.

In the technique used in all transverse-scan video tape recorders, the recording heads are mounted in a rapidly spinning drum which is pressed against the moving tape, so the heads move across the tape in a transverse or nearly vertical path, recording the video signal in consecutive parallel tracks sideways across the tape. This allows use of the entire width of the tape, storing much more data per inch of tape, compared to the fixed head used in audio tape recording, which records a single track down the tape. The heads move across the tape at the high speed necessary to record the high-bandwidth video signal, but the tape moves at a slower speed through the machine. In addition, three ordinary tracks are recorded along the edge of the tape by stationary recording heads. For correct playback, the motion of the heads has to be precisely synchronized with the motion of the tape through the capstan, so a control track of synchronizing pulses is recorded. The other two tracks are for the audio channel and a cueing track.

The early machines use the Ampex 2-inch quadruplex system in which the drum has 4 heads and rotates at 14,400 RPM perpendicular to the tape, so the recorded tracks are transverse to the tape axis. With 2-inch tape this requires 16 tracks for a single analog NTSC video frame or 20 for a PAL frame.

The helical scan methods use a recording drum with a diagonal axis of rotation. The tape is wrapped longitudinally around the drum by idler wheels, so the tape heads, instead of moving across the tape at almost 90° to the direction of motion as in the quadruplex system, move across the tape at a shallow angle, recording a long diagonal track across the tape. This allows an entire frame to be recorded per track. This simplifies the electronics and timing systems. It also allows the recorder to be paused (freeze-framed) during playback to display a single still frame, by simply stopping the tape transport mechanism, allowing the tape heads to repeatedly pass over the same track.

This recording technique has many potential sources of timing errors. If the mechanism runs at an absolutely constant speed, and never varies from moment to moment, or from the time of recording to the time of playback, then the timing of the playback signal is exactly the same as the input. However, imperfection being inevitable, the timing of the playback always differs to some extent from the original signal. Longitudinal error (error arising from effects in the long direction of the tape) can be caused by variations in the rotational rate of the capstan drive, stretching of the tape medium, and jamming of tape in the machine. Transverse error (error arising from effects in the cross-tape direction) can be caused by variations in the rotational speed of the scanning drum and differences in the angle between the tape and the scanning heads (usually addressed by video tracking controls). Longitudinal errors are similar to the ones that cause wow and flutter in audio recordings. Since these errors are not so subtle and since it is standard video recording practice to record a parallel control track, these errors are detected and servomechanisms are adjusted accordingly to dramatically reduce this problem.

== VCR ==
Many of the deficiencies of the open-reel systems were overcome with the invention of the videocassette recorder (VCR), where the videotape is enclosed in a user-friendly videocassette shell. This subsequently became the most familiar type of VTR known to consumers. In this system, the tape is preattached onto two reels enclosed within the cassette, and tape loading and unloading are automated. There is no need for the user to ever touch the tape, and the media can be protected from dust, dirt, and tape misalignments that can foul the recording mechanism. Typically, the only time the user ever touches the tape in a videocassette is when a failure results from a tape getting stuck in the mechanism.

Home VCRs first became available in the early 1970s, with Sony releasing its VO-1600 model in 1971 and with Philips releasing the Model 1500 in England a year later. The first system to be notably successful with consumers was Sony's Betamax (or Beta) in 1975. It was soon followed by the competing VHS (Video Home System) format from JVC in 1977 and later by other formats such as Video 2000 from Philips, V-Cord from Sanyo, and Great Time Machine from Quasar.

The Beta/VHS format war soon began, while the other competitors quickly disappeared. Betamax sales eventually began to dwindle, and after several years VHS emerged as the winner of the format war. In 1988, Sony began to market its own VHS machines, and despite claims that it was still backing Beta, it was clear that the format was no longer viable in most parts of the world. In parts of South America and in Japan, Betamax continued to be popular and was still in production up to the end of 2002.

Later developments saw analog magnetic tapes largely replaced by digital video tape formats. Following this, much of the VTR market, in particular videocassettes and VCRs popular at the consumer level, were also replaced by non-tape media, such as DVD and later Blu-ray optical discs.

== Formats and products ==
Video tape recorder technologies include:

Analog open-reel formats

- 1/4 inch Akai (Akai)
- 1" Type A (Ampex)
- 1" Type B (Fernseh)
- 1" Type C (Ampex and Sony)
- 2" quadruplex (Ampex)
- Ampex 2" helical (Ampex)
- CV-2000 (Sony)
- IVC 2" helical (IVC)
- 1/2" VERA (BBC)

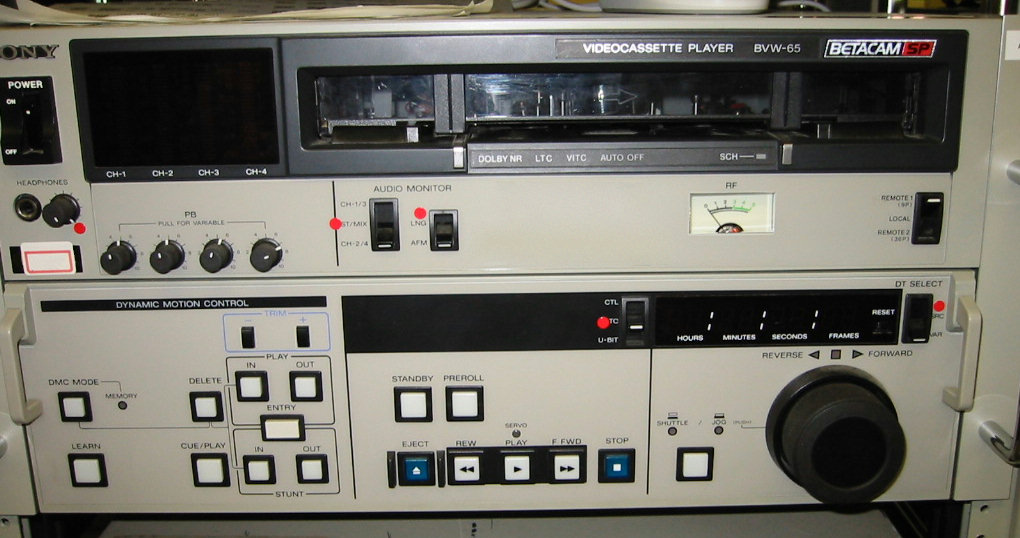
Sony Betacam SP BVW-65 player

Analog cassette formats

- Betacam (Sony)
- Betacam SP (Sony)
- M (Panasonic and RCA)
- MII (Panasonic)
- U-matic (Sony)

Standard-definition digital cassette formats

- D-1 (Sony and BTS)
- D-2 (Sony and Ampex)
- D-3 (Panasonic)
- D-5 (Panasonic)
- D-9/Digital-S (JVC)
- Betacam SX (Sony)
- MPEG IMX (Sony)
- DCT (Ampex)
- Digital Betacam (Sony)
- DVCAM (Sony)
- DVCPRO (Panasonic)

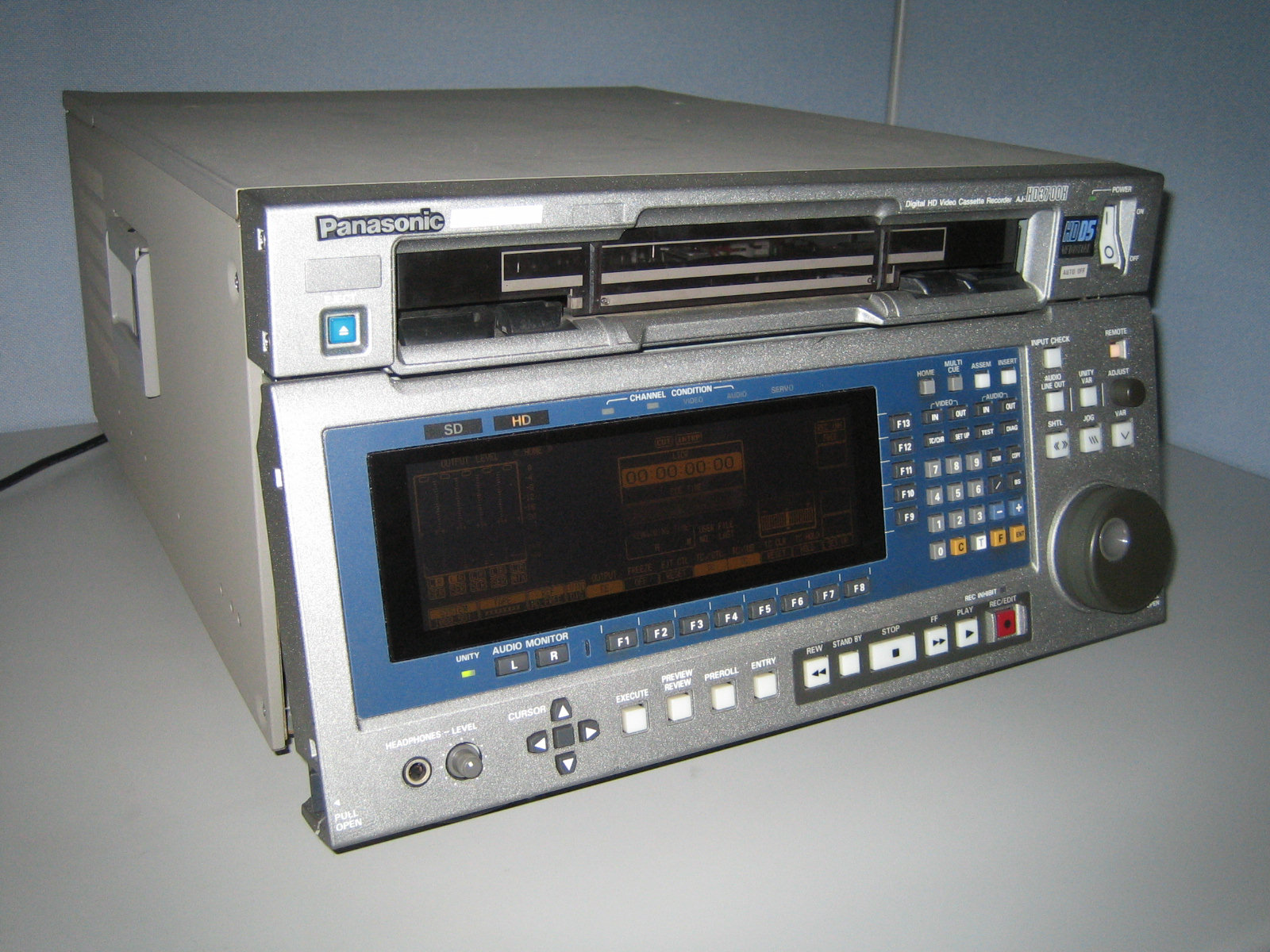
Panasonic D5 Digital VTR, model AJ-HD3700H. The front control panel is hinged below the cassette slot, so that it may be tilted outward to a more comfortable viewing angle for the operator.

High-definition digital cassette formats

- D-5 HD (Panasonic)
- D6 HDTV (BTS)
- DVCPRO HD (Panasonic)
- HDCAM (Sony)
- HDCAM-SR (Sony)
- Sony HDVS (Sony)

Analog consumer formats

- Akai VK (Akai)
- Betamax (Sony)
- Cartrivision (Avco)
- Compact Video Cassette (Funai)
- EIAJ-1 (EIAJ)
- Hi8 (Sony)
- Ruvi (Sony)
- S-VHS (JVC)
- Video8 (Sony)
- Video 2000 (Philips)
- VHS (JVC)
- VHS-C (JVC)
- VX (Panasonic)
- Video Cassette Recording (Philips)
- V-Cord (Sanyo)
- W-VHS (JVC)

Digital and high-definition digital consumer formats

- Digital8 (Sony)
- DV/MiniDV (Sony and Panasonic)
- D-VHS (JVC and Panasonic)
- HDV (JVC)
- MicroMV (Sony)

== Cultural impact ==
The Buggles' hit song "Video Killed the Radio Star", the first video ever to air on MTV, contains the lyric "Put the blame on VTR".
