= Nobutoshi Kihara =

Nobutoshi Kihara (木原 信敏 Kihara Nobutoshi, 14 October 1926 – 13 February 2011) was an engineer at Sony, best known for his work on the original Walkman cassette-tape player in the 1970s and was commonly called Mr. Walkman (Nobutoshi Kihara) in the press.

Born in Tokyo, Kihara attended Waseda University, then joined Sony's predecessor, Tokyo Telecommunications Engineering Corporation in 1947 as a new university graduate. He retired from Sony in 2006.

While at Sony, he worked on Japan's first magnetic tape recorders, portable tape recorders, music stereo systems, Betamax video, digital cameras, a compact cassette magazine-type recorder and Japan's first transistor radio. In 1964, a team led by Kihara developed the CV-2000, the world's first VTR intended for home usage. He also was instrumental in creating cassette versions of the VTR (Video Tape Recorder), established the basis for the U-matic system. In 1981, was involved in the development of the Mavica digital still camera, which used floppy disks to record images and developed the Mavigraph color video printer in 1982.

In 1988, Mr. Kihara jointly established the Sony-Kihara Research Center with Sony, becoming the center's president. His tutoring methods were dubbed the "Kihara School", and turned out many of Sony's future engineers.

Masaru Ibuka, a Sony co-founder, referred to Mr. Kihara as "a godlike person", because he would create a prototype of a concept he and Mr. Ibuka had discussed, often within a day.

Nobutoshi Kihara died at 5:20 am on 13 February 2011, due to heart failure. He was 84.
