= VX (videocassette format) =

Magnetic tape-based consumer videocassette format

- The front and back view of the tape with instruction manual tied to the blocks inside it (US version)
- Media type: Magnetic tape
- Encoding: NTSC, PAL
- Standard: Interlaced video
- Usage: Home movies
- Released: 1975

VX was a consumer analog recording videocassette format developed by Matsushita launched in 1975 in Japan which was short-lived and unsuccessful. In the United States, it was sold using the Quasar brand and marketed under the name "The Great Time Machine" to exhibit its time-shifting capabilities, since VX machines had a companion electro-mechanical clock timer for timed recording of television programs. In Japan, the VX-100 model was launched in 1975, with the VX-2000 following in 1976. The first and only model sold in North America was the Quasar VR-1000 (based on the Panasonic VX-2000), with the VT-100 timer.

== Design ==
The VX cassette itself had both reels of 1/2-inch-wide (13 mm) magnetic tape stacked on top of each other in a coaxial fashion (much like the earlier Cartrivision and Philips VCR formats) in the bottom half of the tape, with a circular opening on the underside of the top half of the cassette, where the video head drum would enter. The tape in this opening was pre-formed in a loop to go around the head drum, eliminating the need for the tape to be pulled out of the cassette and threaded around the drum (as with later videocassette formats such as VHS and Betamax). The opening was protected by a cylindrical plastic plug to protect the tape, which was unscrewed from the opening when the tape was loaded in the machine (by means of moving a horizontal lever on the front of the machine), and inserted back into the tape when ejected (by moving the lever back).

The video head drum itself of a VX machine also has the unique distinction of being completely removable and replaceable without any special tools or equipment. The drum has a knurled nut on top, which can be adjusted by hand, allowing the drum to be removed from the deck for cleaning or replacement. The VX machines have been the only VCR designed with this feature.

== Specifications ==
- Recording method: Single head, alpha wrap helical scan
- Head drum diameter: 48 mm
- Cassette dimensions: 213×146×44 mm (550 g)
- Tape width: ½ inch (12.65 mm)
- Tape speed: 52.133 mm/s
- Video track width: 48 μm (73 μm with guard band)
- Relative velocity: 9.091 m/s
- Video signal: Frequency modulation 3.3–4.6 MHz (chroma signal: Color-under 688.374 kHz)
- Audio signal: 1 channel linear track (0.4 mm)
- Recording time: Originally up to 100 minutes, 120 minute cassettes became available at a later date
