= CCJ connector =

Analog video connector

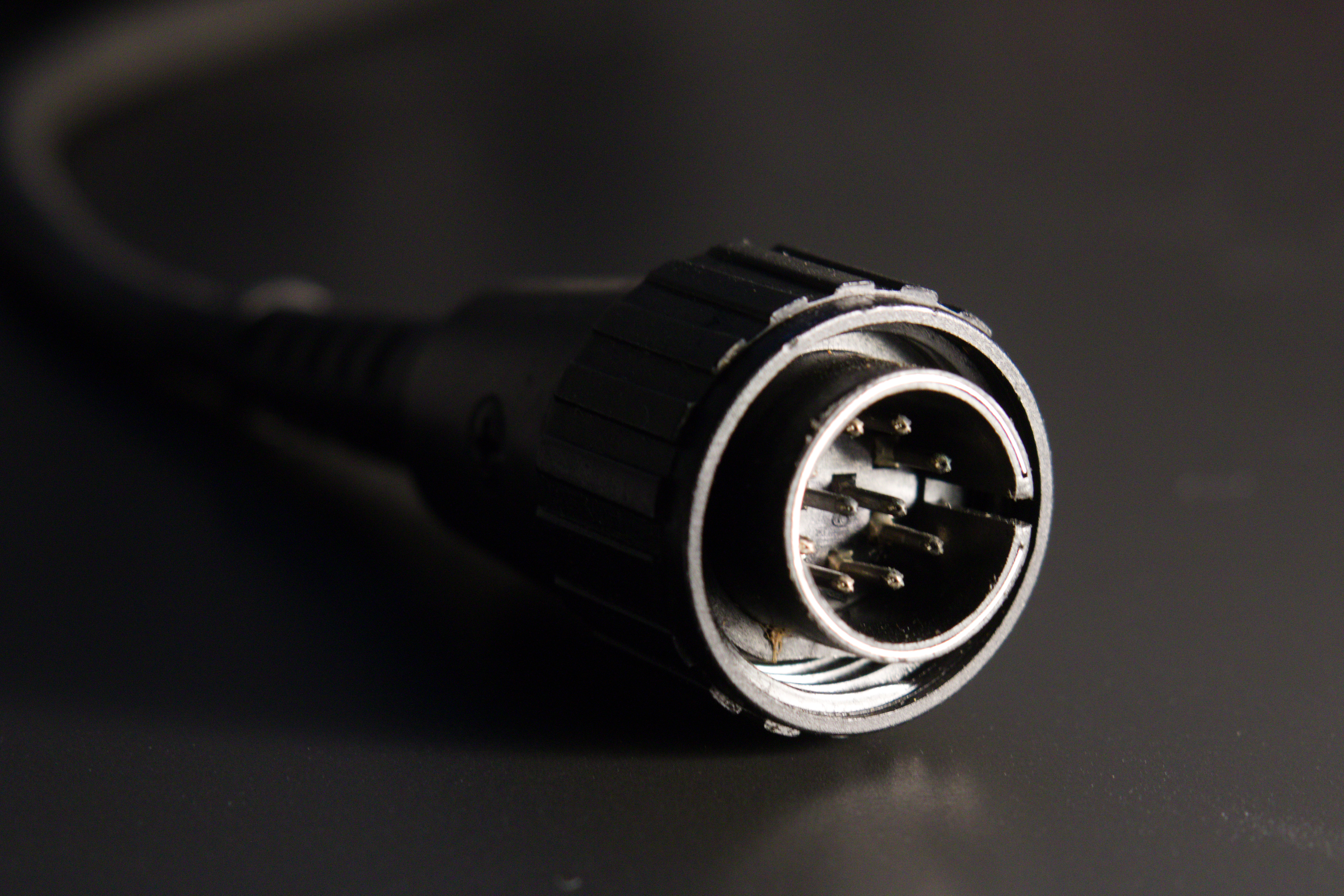
- Close-up view of a CCJ connector manufactured by Hirose from a 1985 Sylvania video camera
- Type: DIN-style connector

Production history
- Designer: Sony
- Designed: c. 1969
- Manufacturer: Various, mainly Hirose Electric Group

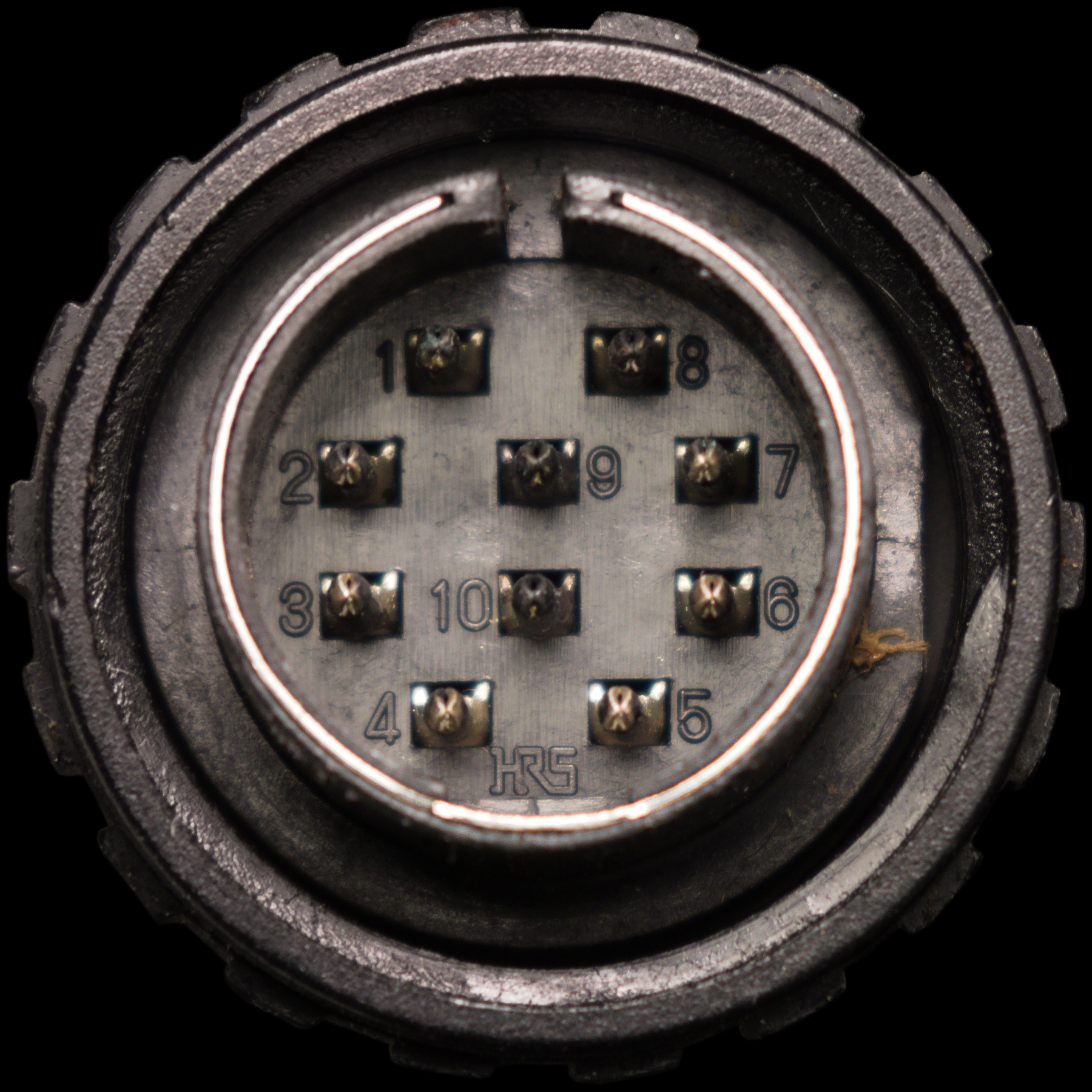
Close-up of the same Hirose-made CCJ connector with embossed numerical pinout

The CCJ connector (short for Camera Cable type J), also known as a J-type connector or an EIAJ connector, is the specification for a 10-pin DIN-style connector established by member companies of the Electronic Industries Association of Japan (EIAJ) in the late 1960s to interconnect various pieces of video camera equipment. Within Japanese-built video camera equipment built from the late 1960s to the mid-1980s, the CCJ connector was especially widely used to connect video cameras to video tape recorders (VTRs), especially battery-powered portable VTRs—so-called portapacks—which were common before the dawn of camcorders, which married both the camera and the VTR.

== History ==
The CCJ connector was developed in the late 1960s alongside the EIAJ-1 specification for open reel video tape. Both standards enabled non-broadcast-professional enthusiasts and industrial prosumers alike to use any competitor's consumer video camera equipment without having to worrying about interoperability in most cases, largely (but not entirely) escaping the vendor lock-in situation present in the field in the earlier portion of the 1960s. Despite being used by many Japanese manufacturers—including but not limited to Sony, Panasonic, Akai, Hitachi, and JVC—for their video camera and tape equipment, the invention of CCJ is largely attributed to Sony.

== Specification ==
A typical CCJ connector for a video camera has a 10-pin DIN-style plug on both ends. All CCJ connectors are keyed with a notch on the north end of the connector preventing it from being plugged in upside-down. For most black and white video cameras, a CCJ cable has separate conductors for the video signal, the audio signal, the horizontal and vertical sync signals, a remote control signal (to trigger the stopping and starting recording from the camera rather than the VTR), a +12 V DC power wire, and a ground wire. While most black and white video cameras conform to a standard pinout, not all do, and with the advent of cameras and portapacks that could record color signals onto EIAJ-1 tape, the pinouts began to diverge greatly.
