= Super Video =

Super Video may refer to:

- S-Video video signal format
- Super VHS videotape format, which used and popularized the S-Video signal format
- Super Video CD format for storing video on standard compact discs
- Super Video variant of Video Cassette Recording, an early domestic analog video recording format
