= V-Cord =

Short lived magnetic tape-based videocassette format

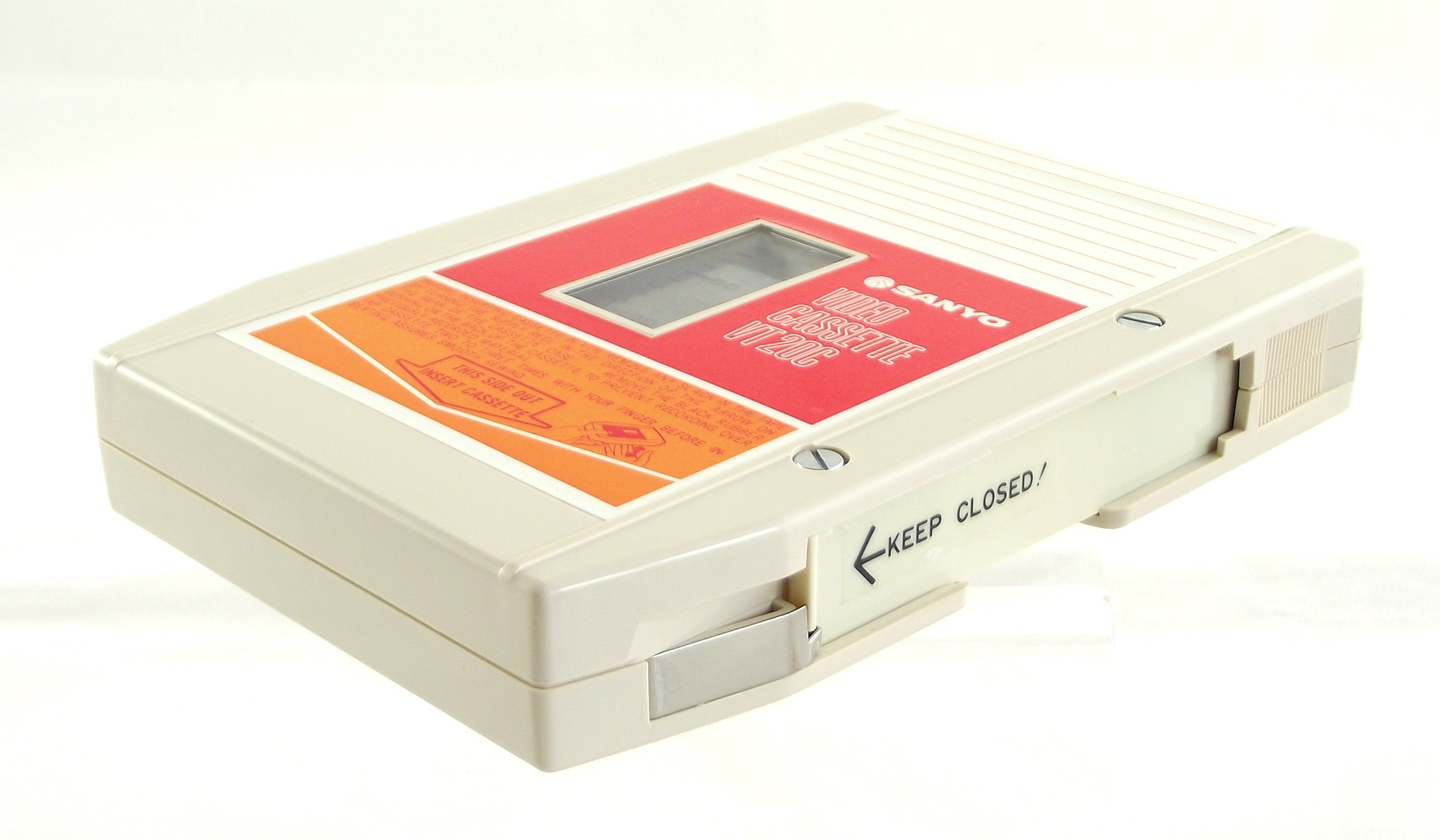
- Media type: Magnetic cassette tape, ½-inch
- Encoding: NTSC, PAL
- Capacity: 60 minutes, 120 minutes
- Developed by: Sanyo
- Usage: Home movies
- Released: 1974; 52 years ago

V-Cord is an analog recording videocassette format developed and released by Sanyo. V-Cord (later referred to as V-Cord I) was released in 1974, and could record 60 minutes on a cassette. V-Cord II, released in 1976, could record 120 minutes on a V-Cord II cassette.

The V-Cord II machines were the first consumer VCRs to offer two recording speeds.

== Appearance ==
The original V-Cord cassette had a large hub and was wound with standard-thickness magnetic tape; V-Cord II used a small hub wound with thin tape, the same thickness later used for VHS-120 and Beta L-750. The cassettes were not rectangular, being tapered at one narrow end. Unlike subsequent formats VHS and Betamax, which loaded with the tape facing front on the long side of the cassette, the V-Cord cartridge was loaded sideways with the narrow side serving as the "front" and the tape coming out the "side".

The tape was held in place in the machine by a notch halfway down the right side of the tape, similar to the means by which an 8-track tape is held in its player.

== Operation ==
The earliest machines recorded only in black and white and had no rewind mechanism, like the Cartrivision format of a few years earlier; an external rewinder was used after recording or playing a tape. External rewinders later became available for the VHS and Beta formats, although the machines could rewind tapes.

== Recording format ==
The system had two recording modes: standard mode (STD), and a long-play mode (LP) which sacrificed recording quality for extra capacity. In STD mode both recording and playback heads are used, writing both fields of each interlaced video frame. In long-play mode only a single head is used to record a single field from each video frame, with each field being read twice on playback, in a "skip field" technique. The heads scanned the tape in a helical scan fashion

Tape was moved forward at 2.91 inches per second in STD mode, and 1.45 inches per second in LP mode; this gave a recording time of one-hour in standard mode and two hours in long-play mode. Horizontal resolution in color was quoted as 250 TVL in advertising materials, stretching to 300 TVL in black-and-white, with a video signal-to-noise ratio of 45 dB. Audio response was specified as 80 to 10,000 Hz at -6 dB in STD mode, dropping to 80 to 8,000 Hz in LP mode.

The tape was a half-inch cobalt doped tape with a 550 oersted coercivity. The cassette measured 4 5/16" by 6 3/16" by 1". Two cassette types were available, a V60 and a V120 whose names matched their recording capacity in LP mode. The cassettes are similar in appearance to eight-track cartridges.

Conventional VHS and Beta formats recorded in a helical scan format, resulting in angled tracks running from the lower edge of the tape to the upper edge some distance down. Unlike these formats, the V-Cord format was closer to the 2-inch quadruplex videotape format used from the inception of video in the late 1950s until 2-inch helical IVC videotape format was introduced twenty years later, in that its tracks ran nearly perpendicular to tape travel.

A portable four-head video recorder, the Sanyo VTC-7100, used a similar format of cassette, but produced incompatible recordings.

== V-Cord VCRs ==
Toshiba KV-4000, KV-4100, and KV-4200; and Sanyo VTC-7300, VTC-8000, VTC-8200, VTC-8400 and VTC-8410 V-Cord I/II VCR (1976)
