= Video 2000 =

Video tape standard

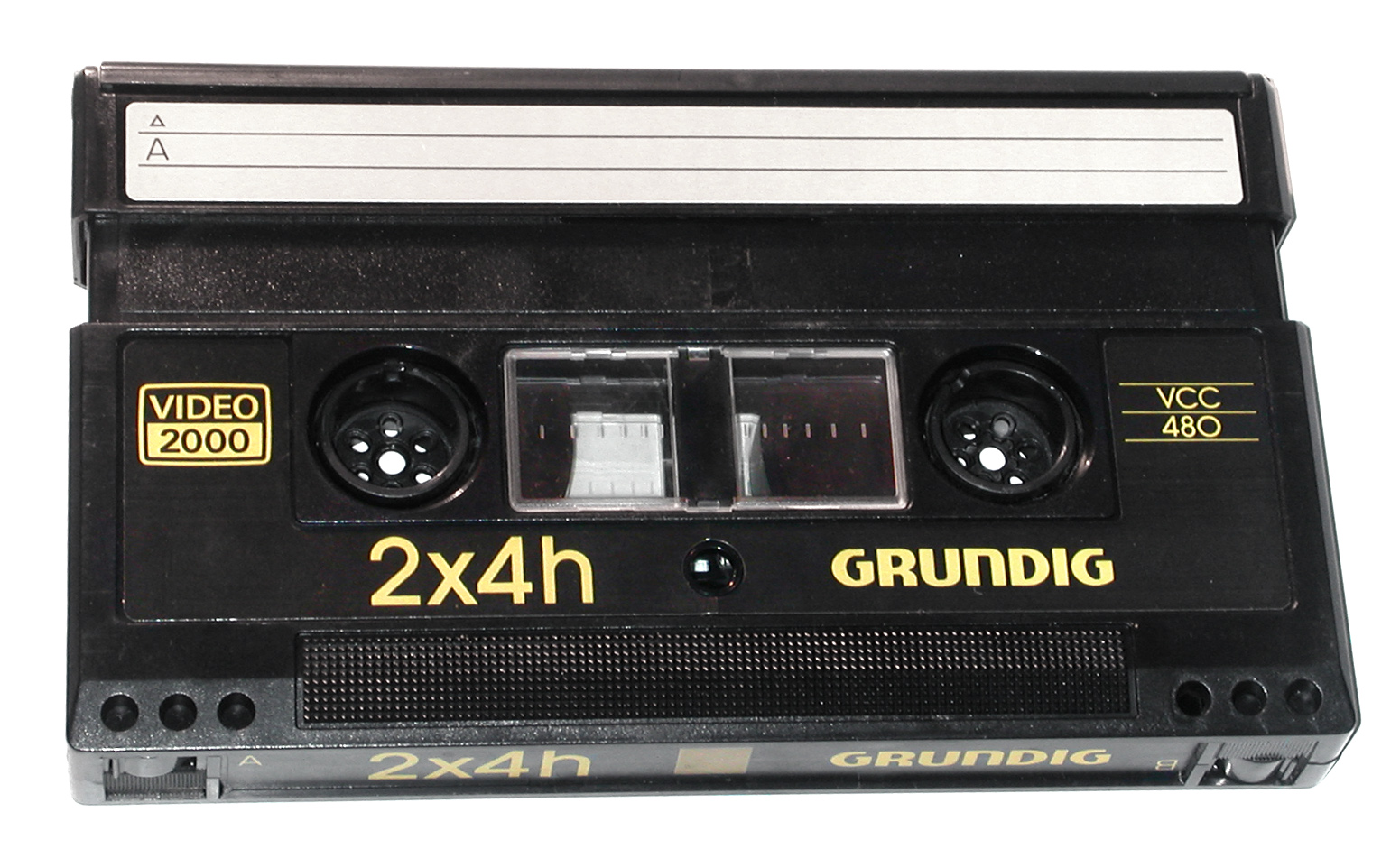
- A Video 2000 videocassette
- Media type: Magnetic cassette tape
- Encoding: PAL
- Standard: 625 lines
- Developed by: Philips; Grundig
- Usage: Home movies
- Released: 1979; 47 years ago
- Discontinued: 1988; 38 years ago

Video 2000 (also known as V2000, with the tape standard Video Compact Cassette, or VCC) is a consumer videocassette system and analog recording standard developed by Philips and Grundig to compete with JVC's VHS and Sony's Betamax video technologies. It was designed for the PAL color television standard, but some models additionally handled SECAM. Distribution of Video 2000 products began in 1979 exclusively in Europe, South Africa and Argentina and ended in 1988.

Although some initial models and advertising featured a mirror-image "VCR" badge based on the logo of Philips's earlier Video Cassette Recording (VCR) system, Video 2000 was an entirely new (and incompatible) format, which incorporated many technical innovations. Despite this, the format was not a major success and was eventually discontinued, having lost out to the rival VHS system in the videotape format war.

== The Video Compact Cassette ==
Philips named the videotape standard Video Compact Cassette (VCC) to complement its landmark audio Compact Cassette format introduced in 1963, but the format itself was marketed under the trademark Video 2000.

Despite the name, VCCs are marginally larger than VHS cassettes—shorter, but thicker and deeper. They have two co-planar reels containing half-inch (12.5 mm) wide chromium dioxide magnetic tape. The format used only half (6.25 mm) of the half-inch tape on a given "side", and so it is occasionally referred to erroneously as a quarter-inch tape format, despite its physical tape width. The cassette can then be flipped over to use the other half of the tape, thus doubling playing time. Additionally, the cassettes can be recorded onto using an “XL” recording mode (similar to VHS’s LP and Betamax’s βII modes), which doubles the playing time again.

=== Tape lengths ===
Common tape lengths
Tape label	Tape length		Recording time	
Tape label	ft	m	Normal	XL
VCC 120	295	90	2 × 60 minutes (=2 h)	2 × 120 minutes (=4 h)
VCC 240	590	180	2 × 120 minutes (=4 h)	2 × 240 minutes (=8 h)
VCC 360	879	268	2 × 180 minutes (=6 h)	2 × 360 minutes (=12 h)
VCC 480	1168	356	2 × 240 minutes (=8 h)	2 × 480 minutes (=16 h)
VCC 540	1312	400	2 × 270 minutes (=9 h)	2 × 540 minutes (=18 h)

== Format and features ==
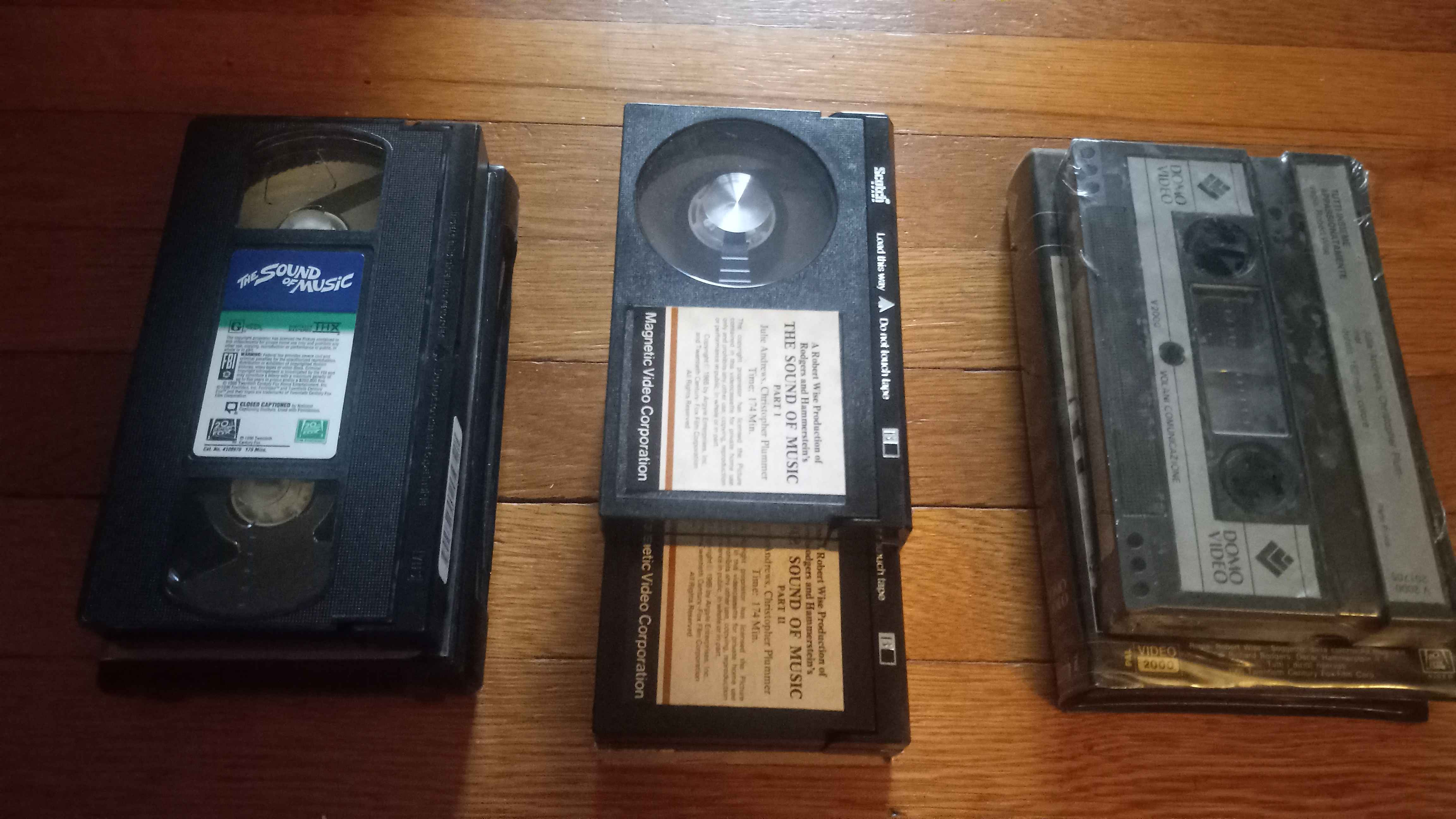
A Video 2000 tape alongside VHS and Beta tapes

Dynamic Track Following (DTF) eliminated the need for a separate control track and enabled the video heads to accurately follow the recorded tracks on the tape during playback. Therefore, by design V2000 machines do not require a video tracking control.

== Launch ==
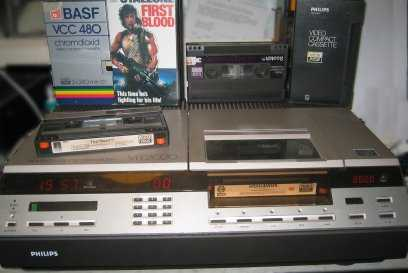
The Philips VR2020 was the first mass-marketed model for the Video 2000 format sold in the United Kingdom.

A key intention of the V2000 format, thanks to DTF, was tape compatibility. A tape from any machine should play perfectly on any other machine. However, when the VR2020 reached the shops it was discovered that its audio head was 2.5 mm out of position compared to that on Grundig's Video 2×4 (model 700). This meant that the sound would be out of sync with the picture when played back on the other type of machine. Both manufacturers' hastily moved the audio head 1.25 mm to a common position, but compatibility issues remained for recordings made on the first generation of machines.

== Machines ==
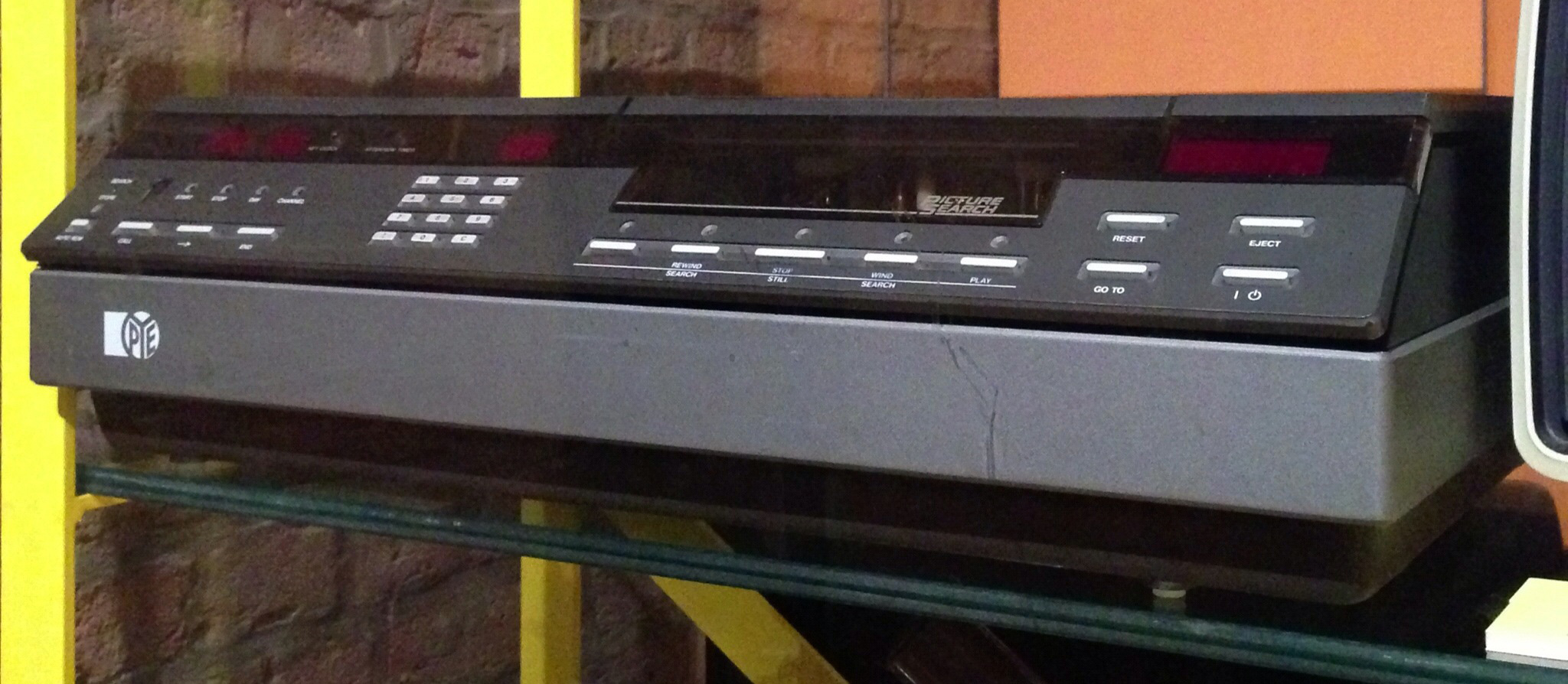
A Pye 20VR22 recorder

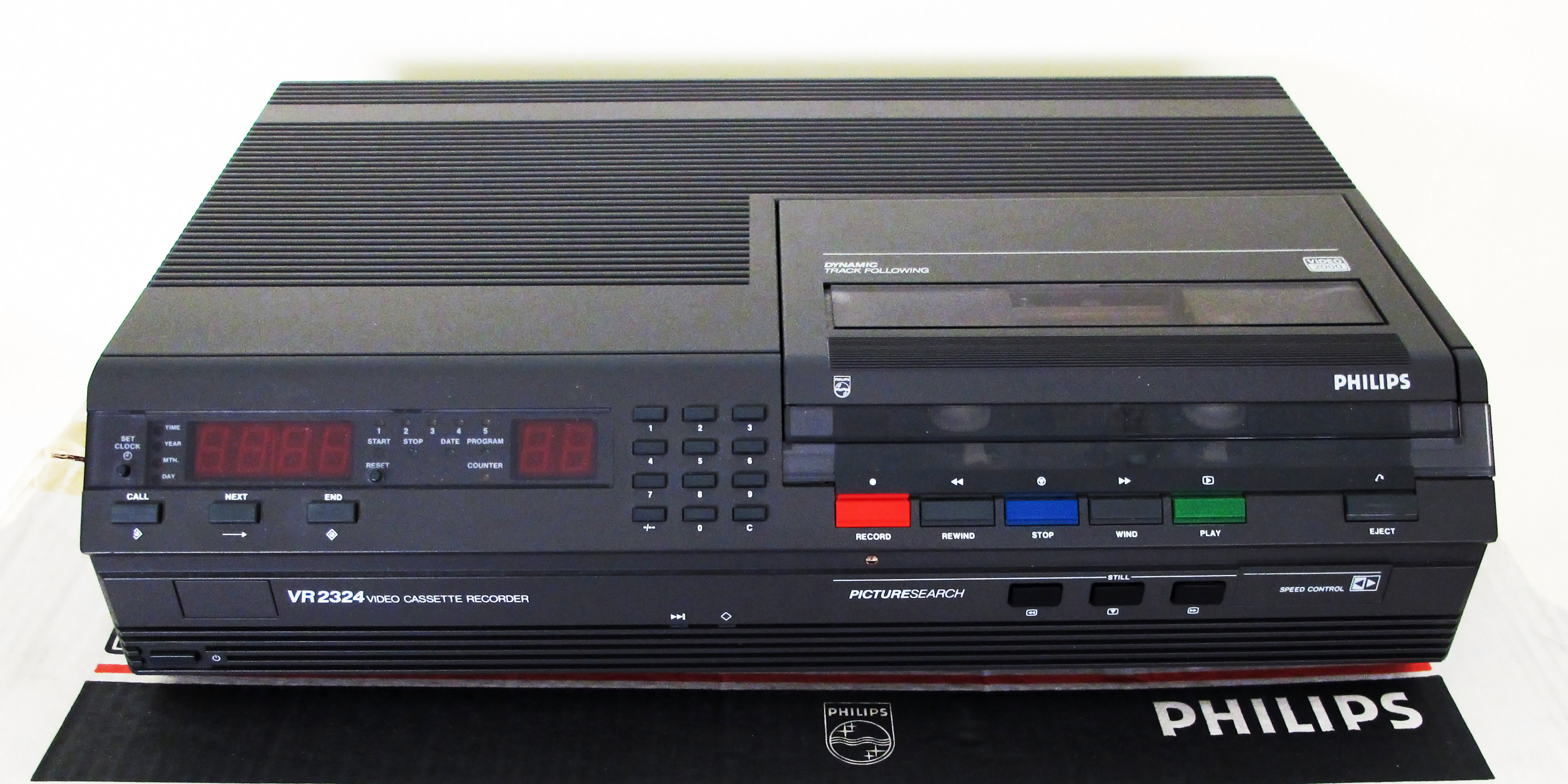
Philips VR2324 recorder

- Philips VR2020
- Philips VR2022
- Philips VR2023
- Philips VR2026 (PAL/SECAM tuner—recorded SECAM as PAL)
- Philips VR2340
- Philips VR2324
- ITT VR681
