= Video Cassette Recording =

Magnetic tape-based videocassette format

- Media type: Video recording media
- Encoding: PAL
- Standard: 625-line
- Developed by: Philips
- Usage: Home video, Educational use
- Released: 1972; 54 years ago

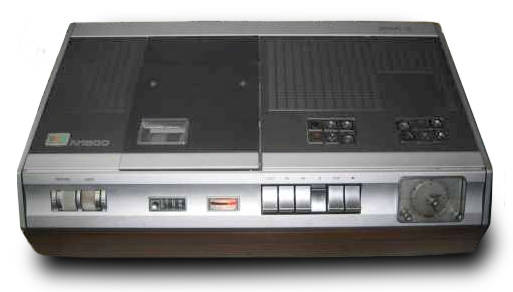
An N1500 video recorder, with wooden cabinet.

Video Cassette Recording (VCR) is an early domestic analog recording format designed by Philips. It was the first successful consumer-level home videocassette recorder (VCR) system. Later variants included the VCR-LP and Super Video (SV) formats.

The VCR format was introduced in 1972, just after the Sony U-matic format in 1971. Although at first glance the two might appear to have been competing formats, they were aimed at very different markets. After failing as a consumer format, U-matic was marketed as a professional television production format, whilst VCR was targeted particularly at educational but also domestic users. Unlike some other early formats such as Cartrivision, the VCR format does record a high-quality video signal without resorting to Skip field.

Home video systems had previously been available, but they were open-reel systems (such as the Sony CV-2000) and were expensive to both buy and operate. They were also unreliable and often only recorded in black and white such as the EIAJ-1. The VCR system was easy to use and recorded in color but was still expensive: when it was introduced in 1972 the N1500 recorder cost nearly £600 (equivalent to £7,100 in 2025). By comparison, a small car (the Morris Mini) could be purchased for just over £600.

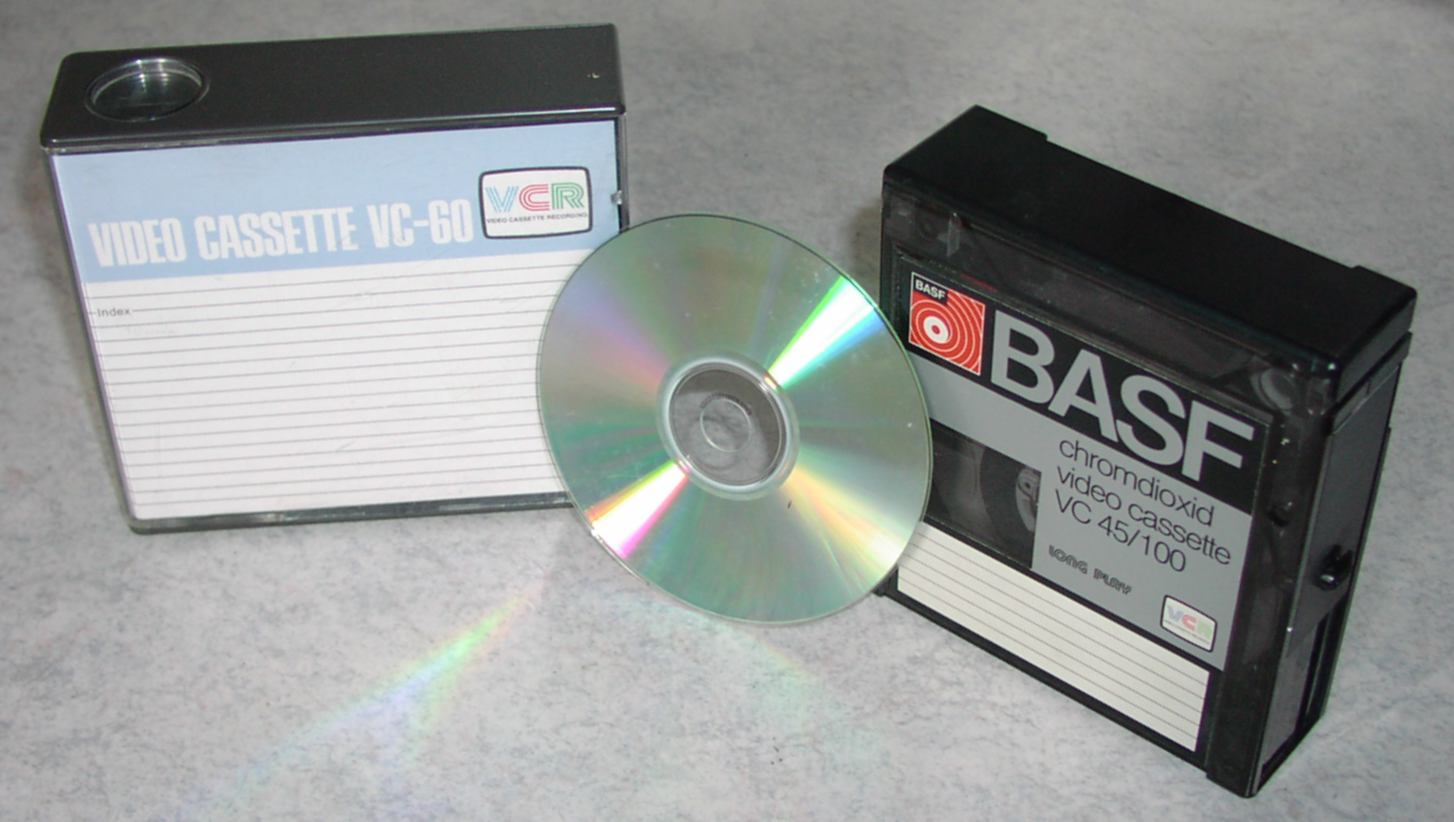
VCR-format video cassettes with one inside a case (left) and the other on its own (right). A CD is shown for scale.

The VCR format used large square cassettes with 2 co-axial reels, one on top of the other, containing 1/2-inch-wide (12.7 mm) chrome dioxide magnetic tape. Three playing times were available: 30, 45 and 60 minutes. The 60-minute videocassettes proved very unreliable, suffering numerous snags and breakages due to the very thin 17-micrometre (0.67-mil) video tape. Tapes of 45 minutes or less contained 20-micrometre (0.79-mil) thickness tape. The mechanically complicated recorders themselves also proved somewhat unreliable. One particularly common failing occurred should tape slack develop within the cassette; the tape from the top (takeup) spool may droop into the path of the bottom (supply) spool and become entangled in it if rewind was selected. The cassette would then completely jam and require dismantling to clear the problem, and the tape would then be creased and damaged.

The system predated the development of the slant azimuth technique to prevent crosstalk between adjacent video tracks, so it had to use an unrecorded guard band between tracks. This required the system to run at a tape speed of 14.29 cm/s (5.63 inches per second). 6.56 cm/s (2.58 inches per second) was the speed of the long play variant. 3.95 cm/s (1.56 inches per second) was the speed of Grundig's Super Video variant.

The Philips VCR system brought together many advances in video recording technology to produce the first truly practical home video cassette system. The very first Philips N1500 model included all the essential elements of a domestic video cassette recorder:

- Simple loading of cassette and simple operation using "Piano Key" controls, with full auto-stop at tape ends.
- A tuner for recording off-air television programmes.
- A clock with timer for unattended recordings.
- A modulator to allow connection to a normal (for the time) television receiver without audio and video input connectors.

The Philips VCR system was marketed only in the UK, mainland Europe, Australia and South Africa. In mid-1977, Philips announced they were considering distribution of the format in North America, and it was test marketed for several months. Because the format was initially designed only for use with the 625-line 50-hertz (3,000 rpm) PAL system, VCR units had to be modified in order to work with the 60-hertz (3,600 rpm) NTSC system. The tape speed had to be increased by 20% to accommodate the higher frame rate of NTSC, which resulted in a 60-minute PAL tape running for 50 minutes in a NTSC machine. DuPont announced a thinner videotape formulation that would allow a 60-minute NTSC VCR tape (and roughly 70 minutes in PAL), but the tape was even less reliable than previous formulations. Ultimately, Philips abandoned any hope of trying to sell their VCR format in North America, partly because of the reliability issues, and partly because of the introduction of VHS that same year.

== Variants ==
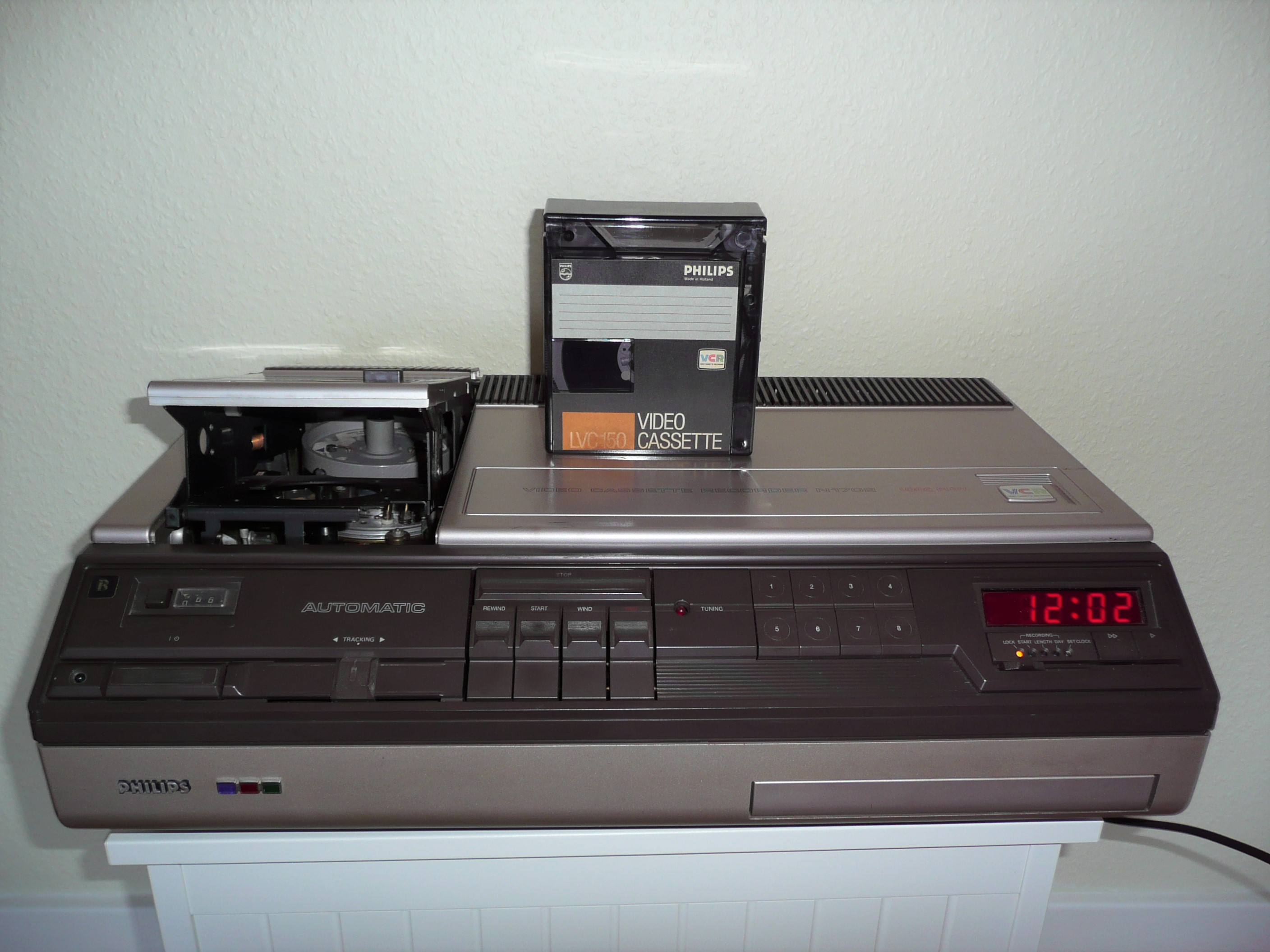
Philips N1702. A VCR-LP recorder.

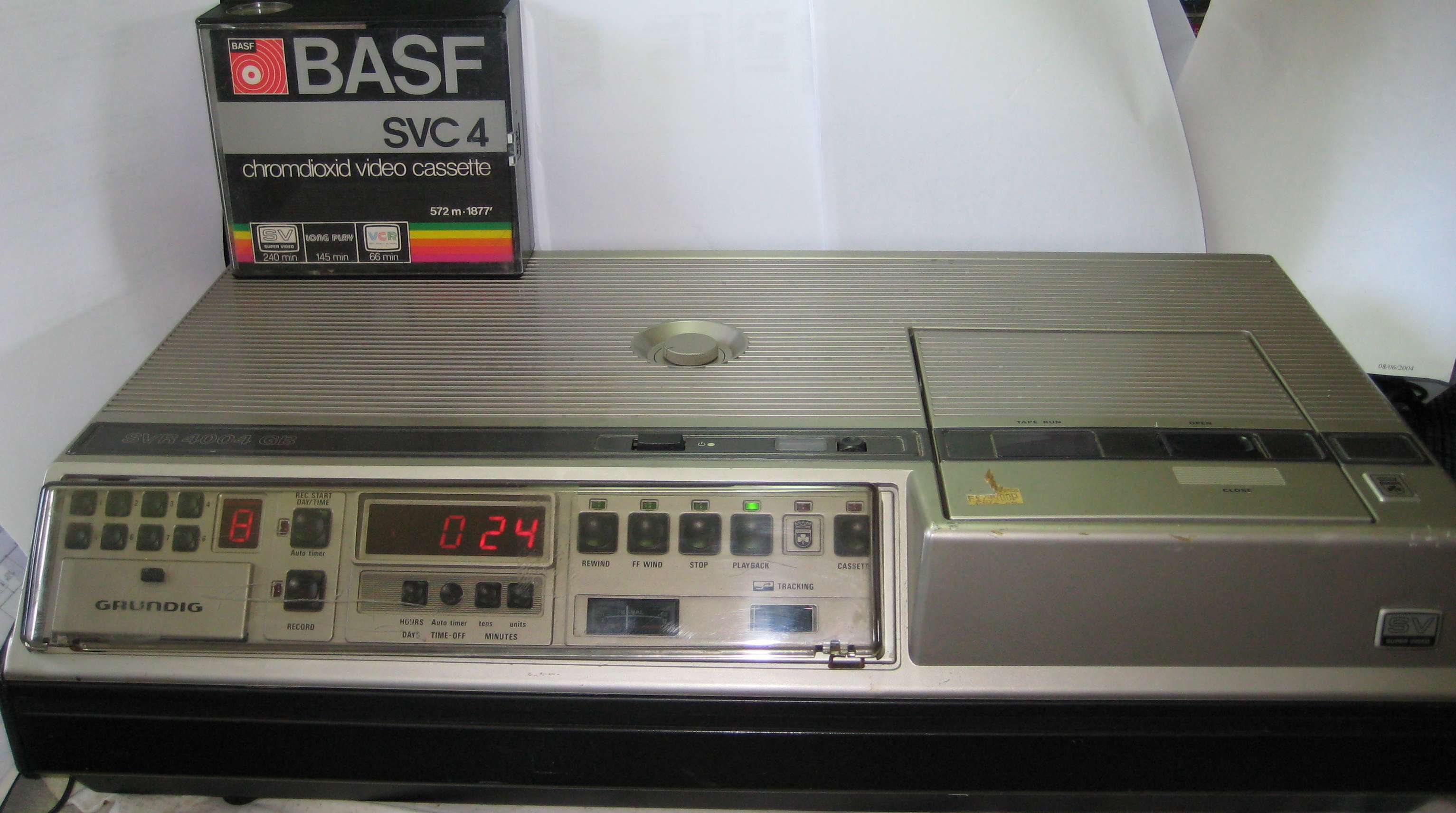
The rare Grundig SVR4004 machine.

VCR later evolved into a related format known as VCR-LP. This exploited slant azimuth to greatly increase the recording time. Although both formats used identical VCR cassettes, the recordings were incompatible between the two systems, and few if any dual-format recorders existed. Philips N1700, released in 1977, supported the VCR-LP format.

A later even longer-playing variant, Super Video (SV) was manufactured by Grundig exclusively. SV was designed to exclusively use BASF- and Agfa-manufactured chrome-dioxide tape in cassettes that were identical to the earlier Philips ones, with the exception of a small actuator added to the bottom of the cassette. This meant that only the BASF/Agfa tapes would work in machines, but that such tapes could also be used in the older VCR and VCR-LP machines. Just as VCR-LP recordings are incompatible with VCR, so SV recordings are incompatible with both VCR and VCR-LP. The only model to be built was the Grundig SVR4004, with a few detail variations such as optional audio/video connectors, plus a rebadged ITT 240.

== Cassette playing times ==
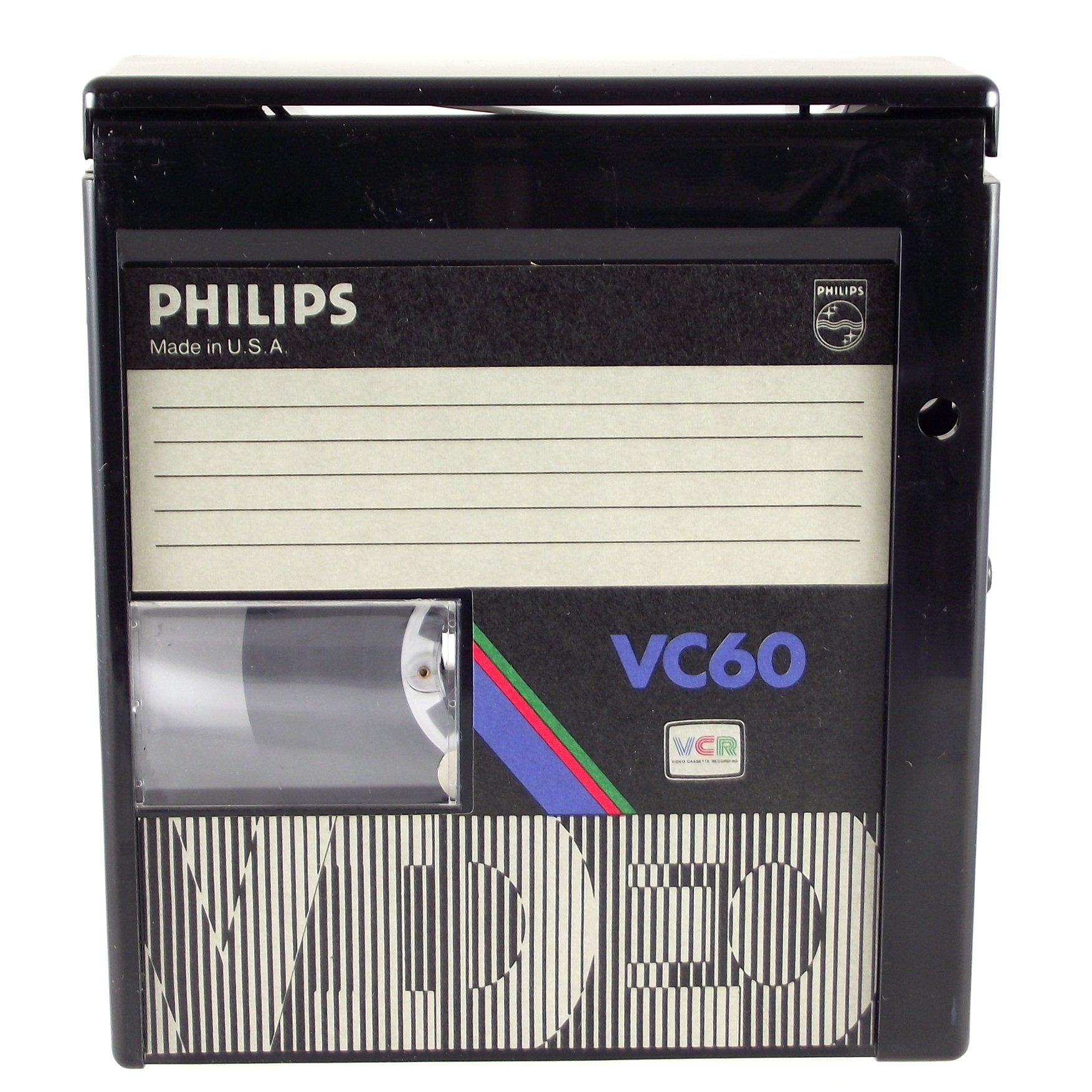
Front view of a Philips VC60 cassette.

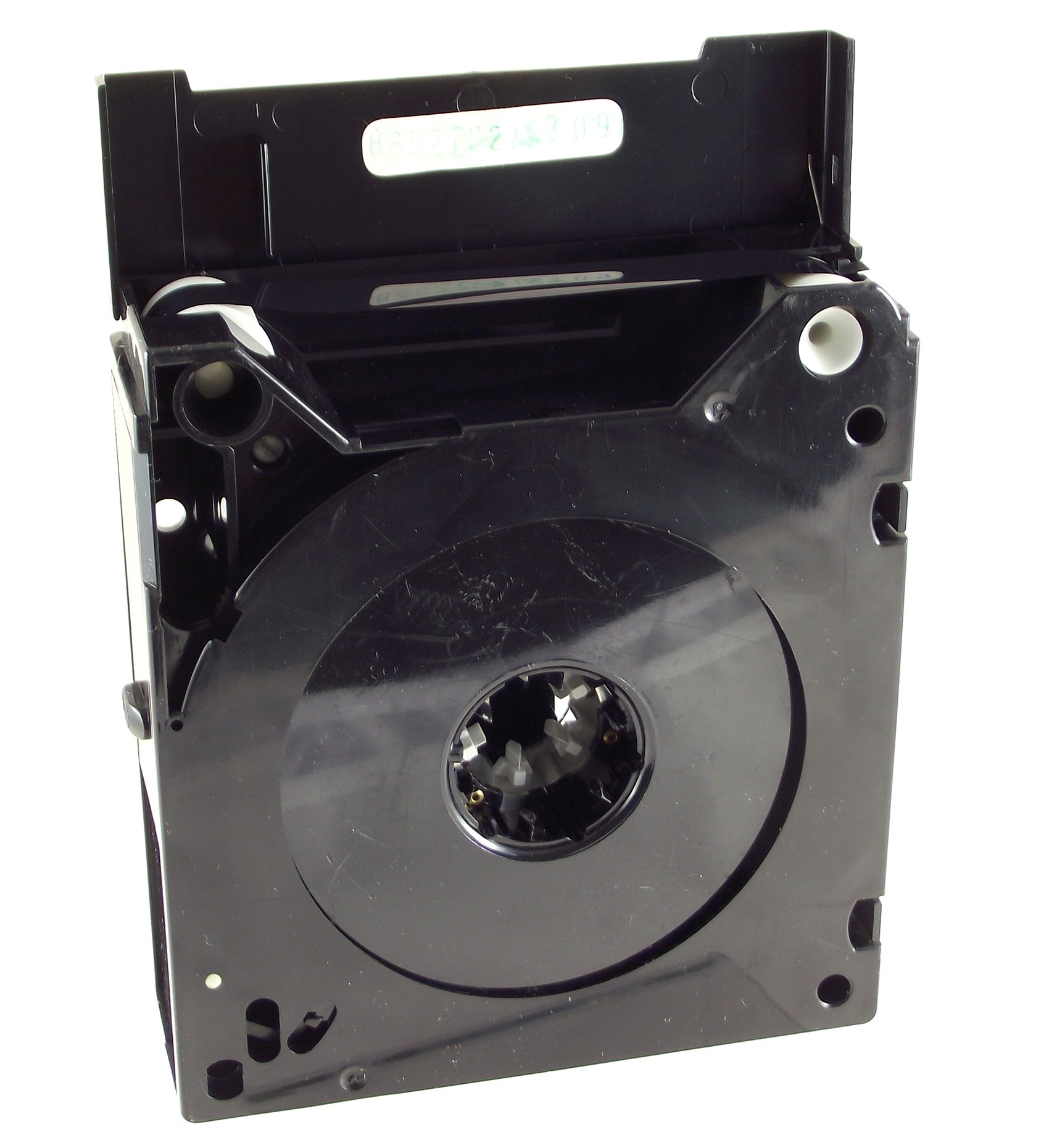
Rear view of the Philips VC60 cassette with the tape exposed

This chart provides an overview of playing times (in minutes) for the most common cassettes released for standard VCR, VCR-LP and SV.

VC cassettes were originally developed for standard VCR. LVC cassettes were developed for VCR-LP, but are physically identical to VC cassettes. SVC cassettes were specifically developed for SV.

| Tape label | Playing time | | |
| Tape label | VCR | VCR-LP | SV |
|---|---|---|---|
| VC 30 | 30 | 65 | -** |
| VC 45 | 45 | 97 | - |
| VC 60 | 60 | 130 | - |
| LVC 60 | 27 | 60 | - |
| LVC 90 | 41 | 90 | - |
| LVC 120 | 55 | 120 | - |
| LVC 150 | 69 | 150 | - |
| LVC 180 | 83* | 180 | - |
| SVC 2 | 30 | 70 | 120 |
| SVC 3 | 50 | 105 | 180 |
| SVC 4 | 65 | 145 | 240 |
| SVC 4.25 | 70 | 150 | 255 |

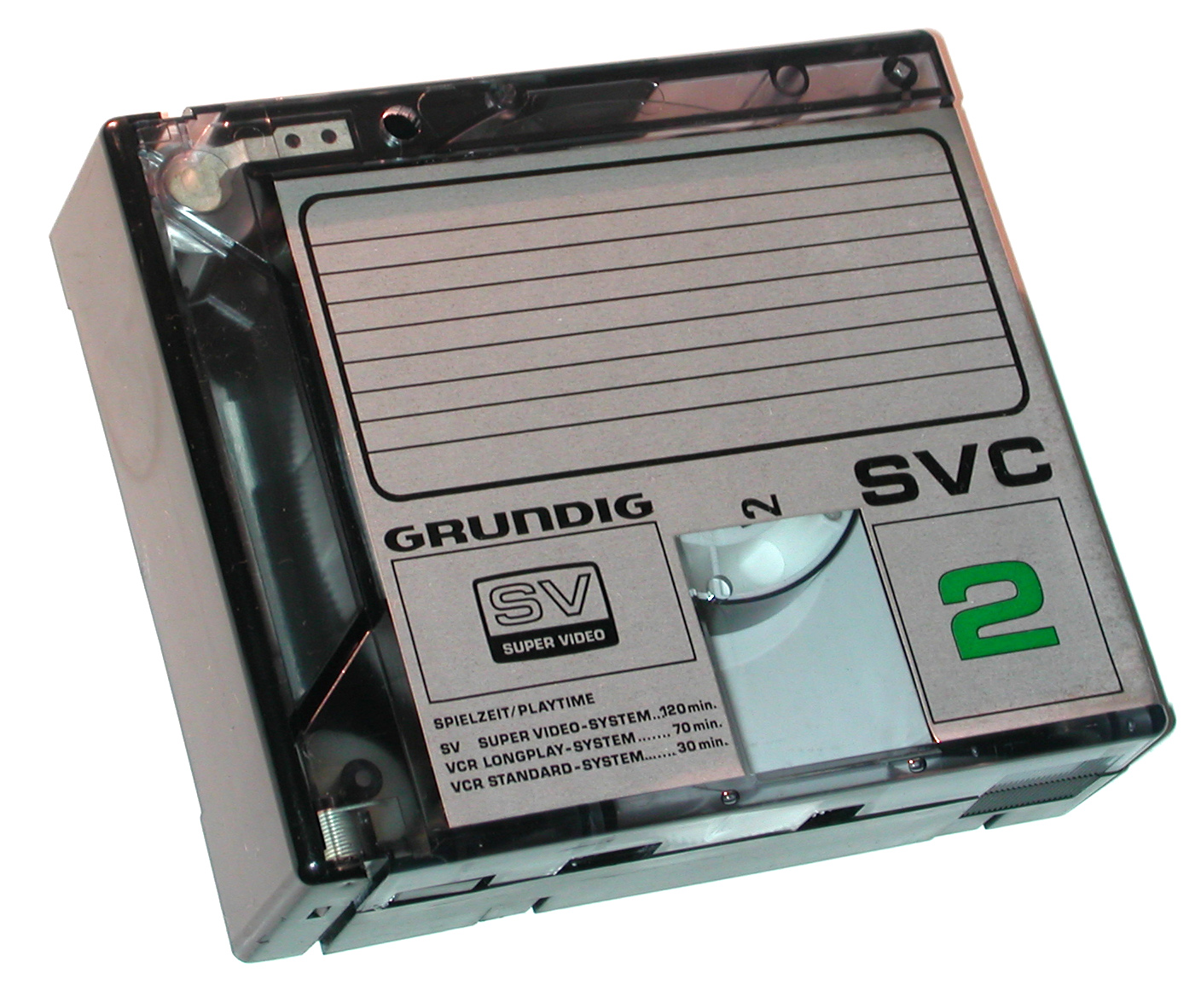
SVR-compatible cassette (with running times marked for SVR, standard VCR and VCR-LP usage)

*) LVC 180 was not recommended for use in a standard VCR machine due to a thin tape base.

**) VC and LVC cassettes do not work in a SV machine. However, SVC cassettes may be used in VCR and VCR-LP machines.

== Models ==
=== N1500 (1972) ===
The first Philips machine was model number N1500, after which the format is also known. This had "first generation" mechanics including magnetic braking servo systems applied to relatively large mains voltage induction motors. The outer edge of the cabinet was wooden. The power cable was detachable, but used an obscure connector for which replacements are not readily available. The N1520 was a N1500 without TV tuner and timer, but with editing functions assemble and insert (using four video heads), 2 track linear audio (not stereo but independent mono channels) and direct AV in/out connections.

=== N1460 (Released 1973) ===
Often found in schools and colleges where a few master VCR recorders made off-air recordings and the cheaper N1460s were used for playback. In Poland, a slightly modified version was made under the name Unitra magnetowid kasetowy MTV-20.

=== N1501 (Released 1974) ===
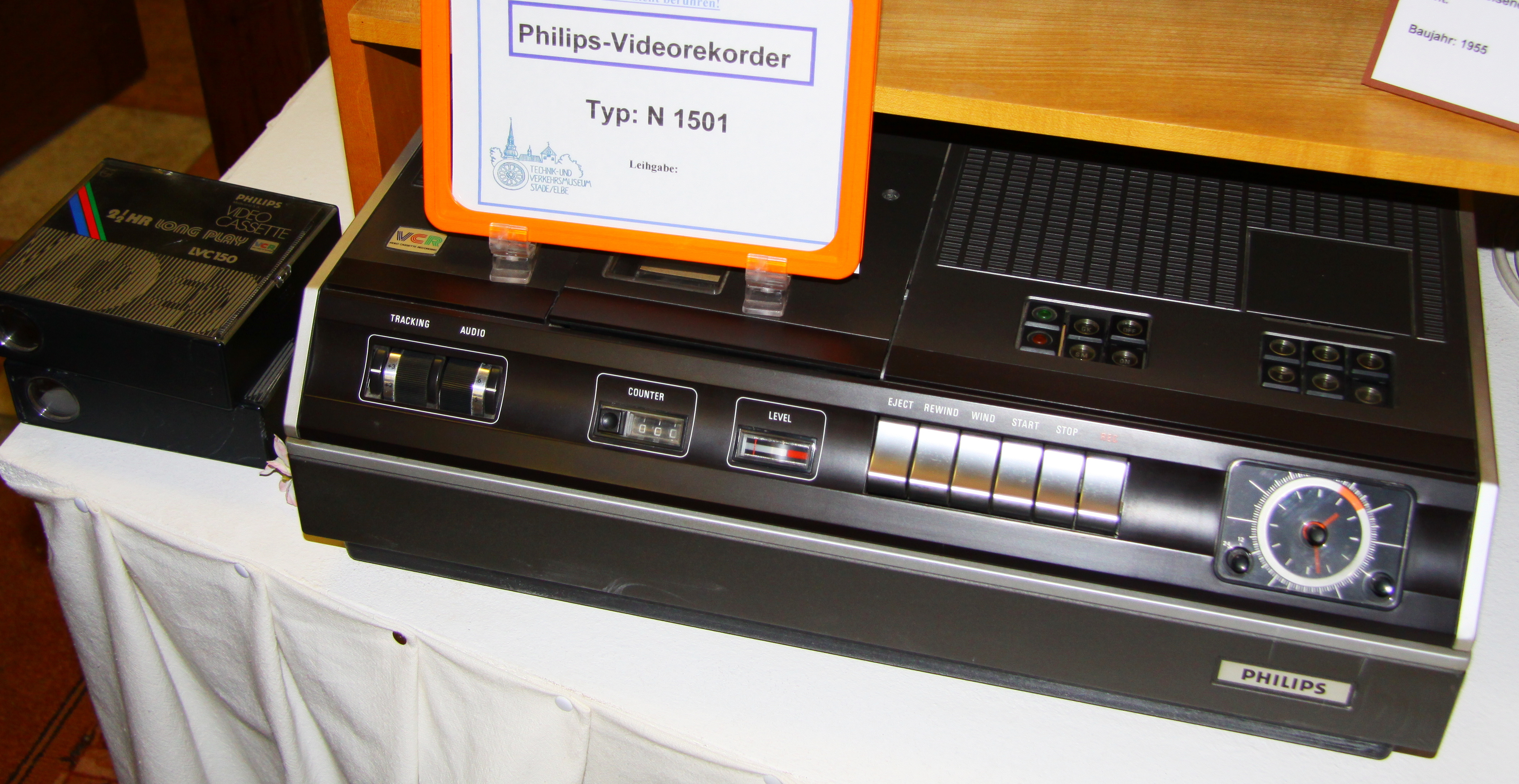
N1501 and VCR video cassettes

AC Mains present all over the place inside: mains motors, mains clock etc. Slightly improved colour circuitry compared to the original N1500, also modified field blanking to reduce flyback interference on some televisions. Cosmetic variations on the N1500, with black replacing the silver frontage and black plastic surround rather than wood.

=== N1502 (Released 1976) ===
The later model N1502 had a totally different mechanism using DC motors and more advanced electronics, and was somewhat more reliable. A later version again was still called N1502 but had further significant mechanical and electronic advances, and in particular had a worm drive for operation of the loading mechanism rather than a fragile plastic gearbox assembly. Earlier machines had a hardwired mains cable, later ones were fitted with a standard "Figure-8" C7 power socket.

=== N1512 (Released 1976) ===
The N1512 model offered composite video input and output connectors, but was otherwise the same as the N1502. The VCR-LP model N1700 was closely related to the later N1502 variant. Other, rarer Philips models included stereo sound and editing capabilities.

Circuitry and internal layout was much more modular than the first generation Philips VCRs. Used quiet DC motors (First generation VCRs used hefty synchronous AC mains motors). Basically this model was the same as the Philips N1502 with an extra board for video in / out. Channel button 8 selected video in.

=== N1700 (Released 1977) ===
Superficially similar to the Philips N1502 both externally and internally. Some components were interchangeable between the two models. Slower tape-speed and a slant-azimuth recording technique (to almost eliminate cross-talk between video tracks without using tape-wasting guard-bands) made possible the longer playing time without a noticeable loss in picture quality. The mains lead was hard-wired into the machine; however later releases of the N1700 had a removable lead - this would become standard on the N1702 model. Also on later models, presumably as the company had already started production of the N1702, the internal Video Head is also sometimes labelled as N1702 instead of N1700. The price in the UK was around £700 which would be over £5,500 in 2023. A Skantic branded clone model VCR 12092819 had the silver top design of the later N1700 model.

Denis Norden promoted this model in the industrial video "The Philips Time Machine".

=== N1702 (Released 1979) ===
Similar to the Philips model N1700, the N1702 had a lighter coloured top cover (N1702 was silver and black whilst the N1700 was grey). A 4-digit counter, a 9-day timer, separate mains lead (not hardwired in), and a test-pattern generator to aid TV tuning. Tape transport legends in slightly different position on later N1702's.

=== Grundig models ===
Grundig built a VCR4000 VCR-LP model which had microprocessor control and so treated the tapes more gently than the purely mechanical decks, and the SVR4004 (longer running SV format) model was very similar. Other Grundig models included the VCR3000 (believed to be VCR format) and VCR5000AV (believed to be the only dual format VCR and VCR-LP machine).

== Replacement ==
In the late 1970s, the VCR formats were superseded altogether by Video 2000 (also known as 'Video Compact Cassette' or VCC). Due to the similar initialisms, and the fact that both were designed by Philips, the 'VCC' and 'VCR' formats are often confused. However, the two systems are incompatible, and there are significant differences between them. Some Video 2000 machines carry a modified version of the "VCR" logo (such as had appeared on the N1500 and N1700 machines), adding further to this confusion.
