= Television lines =

Horizontal resolution specification

TVL is defined as the maximum number of alternating light and dark vertical lines that can be resolved per picture height.

EIA 1956 video resolution target, used to measure TVL

Television lines (TVL) is a specification of an analog camera or monitor's horizontal image resolution. The TVL is one of the most important resolution measures in a video system. The TVL can be measured with the standard EIA 1956 resolution chart.

== Definition ==
TVL is defined as the maximum number of alternating light and dark vertical lines that can be resolved per picture height. A resolution of 400 TVL means that 200 distinct dark vertical lines and 200 distinct white vertical lines can be counted over a horizontal span equal to the height of the picture. For example, on 4 by 3 inches (10.2 cm × 7.6 cm) monitor with 400 TVL, 200 vertical dark lines can be counted over 3 inches (7.6 cm) width on monitor (Note that the 3 inches (7.6 cm) of monitor height is used rather than the 4 inches (10 cm) of whole monitor width).

TVL is an inherent quality of a camera or monitor, influenced by the visual bandwidth of the transmission system used. It should not be confused with the number of horizontal scanning lines of such systems, which e.g. 625 lines for the PAL system, 525 lines for the NTSC system.

The following table shows the horizontal resolutions of some analog video systems:

System	Television Lines	
System	Luma	Chroma
CV-2000	220	
VHS, EV, Video8	240	30
EIAJ-2	240	
U-matic	240	
V-Cord	250	
CED	250	
Betamax, VHS HQ	250	30
SuperBeta	280	30
Betacam	300	120
U-matic SP	330	
NTSC broadcast	330	70
Betacam SP	340	120
Type A	350	120
S-VHS, Hi8	400	30
Quadruplex (NTSC)	400	120
LaserDisc (NTSC)	420	70
PAL D	470	102
ED Beta	500	30
MUSE	598	209

== Limitations ==
Since analog transmission of video is scan line-based, the same number of horizontal lines is always transmitted. However, several factors impede the ability to display fine detail within a line:

1. The camera or other source of material.
2. The storage and processing of the picture.
3. The transmission of the TV signal e.g. broadcast by radio or by cable.
4. The reception and reproduction of the picture on a TV set.

== See also ==
- Kell factor, which limits the vertical resolution in analog television, and both horizontal and vertical resolution in digital television, to a fraction of the number of scan lines or pixels
