= Skip field =

Method used on videotapes to conserve space

In video, skip field recording is a process in which only one field (one half of a frame) of video is recorded in order to conserve recording media space. In some cases, the quality loss from not using both fields is negligible, although it leads to a reduction in vertical and temporal resolution. It was a common method used in early telerecording systems, as well as early and current non-professional/industrial videotape formats such as CV-2000, Cartrivision and V-Cord.

== See also ==
- Low-definition television
