= EIAJ-1 =

Standard for video tape recorders

EIAJ-1 Format Videotape
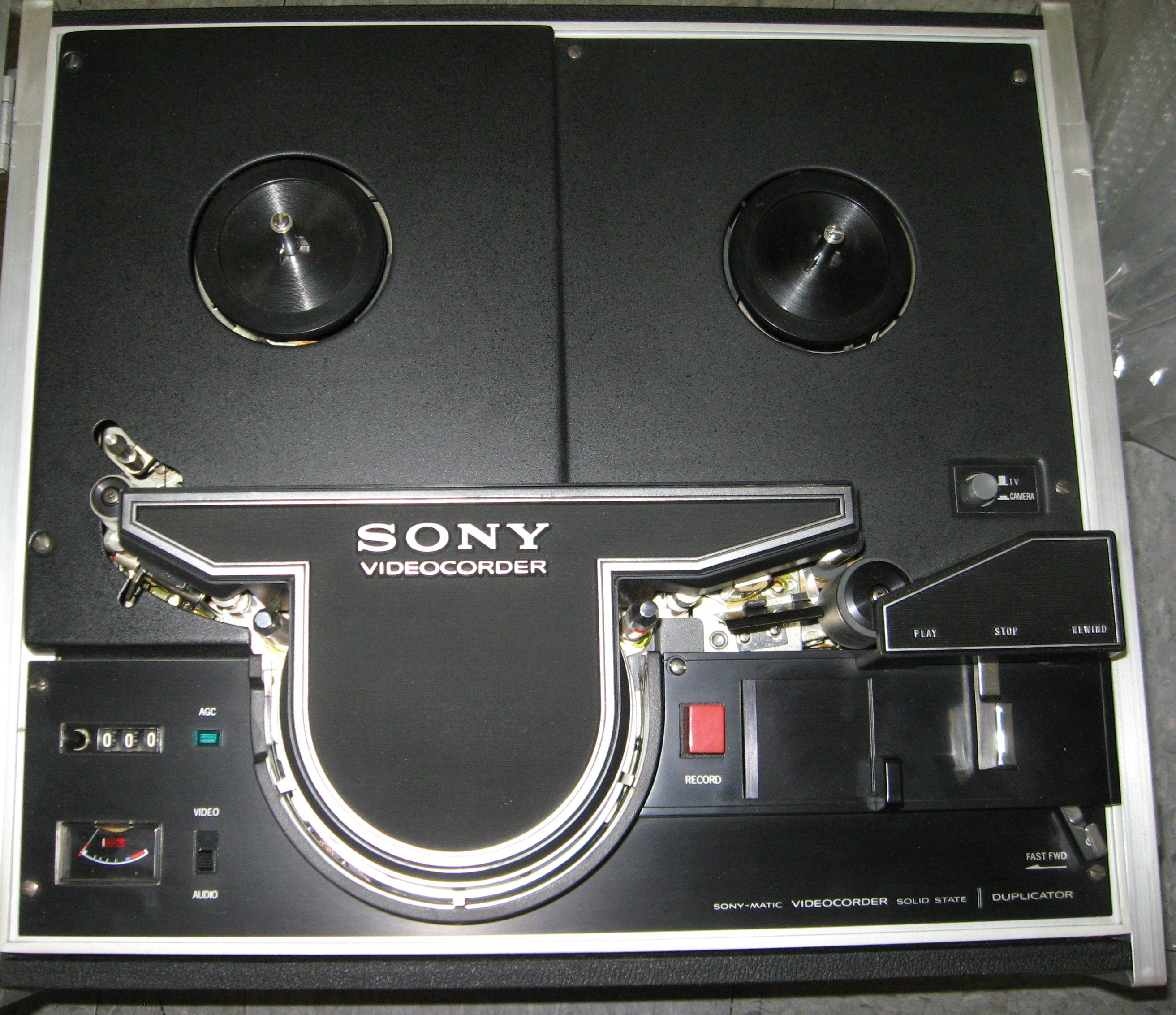
- Sony 1/2 inch VTR, Model A3500
- Media type: Magnetic tape
- Encoding: NTSC, PAL
- Developed by: Sony
- Usage: Home movies, Industrial & educational video production
- Extended to: EIAJ-2
- Released: 1969; 56 years ago

EIAJ-1 was a standard for video tape recorders (VTRs) developed by the Electronic Industries Association of Japan with the cooperation and assistance of several Japanese electronics manufacturers in 1969. It was the first standardized format for industrial/non-broadcast VTRs using a helical scan system employing open reel tape. Previously, each manufacturer of machines in this market used a different proprietary format, with differing tape speeds, scanner drum diameters, bias frequencies, tracking head placement, and so on, although most used 1/2" wide tape. As a result, video tapes recorded on one make and/or model of VTR could only be interchanged with other machines using that specific format, hampering compatibility. For example, a reel of tape recorded on a Panasonic machine would not play on a Sony machine, and vice versa. The EIAJ-1 standard ended this incompatibility, giving those manufacturers a standardized format, interchangeable with almost all VTRs subsequently brought to market around that time. The format offered black-and-white video recording and playback on 1/2″ magnetic tape on a 7″ diameter open reel, with portable units using smaller 5″ diameter reels.

== Uses ==
The EIAJ-1 standard paved the way for consumer oriented non-professional analog video recording technology to become more affordable and widespread, with many businesses, schools, government agencies, hospitals, and even some consumers adopting the format in the early 1970s. Some of the first public-access television cable stations that started up around that time used EIAJ-1 equipment extensively, due to its portability, low cost, and versatility. The original Sony Portapak, model CV-2000, used a proprietary format, but was later superseded by an EIAJ-1 compatible version, the AV-3400.

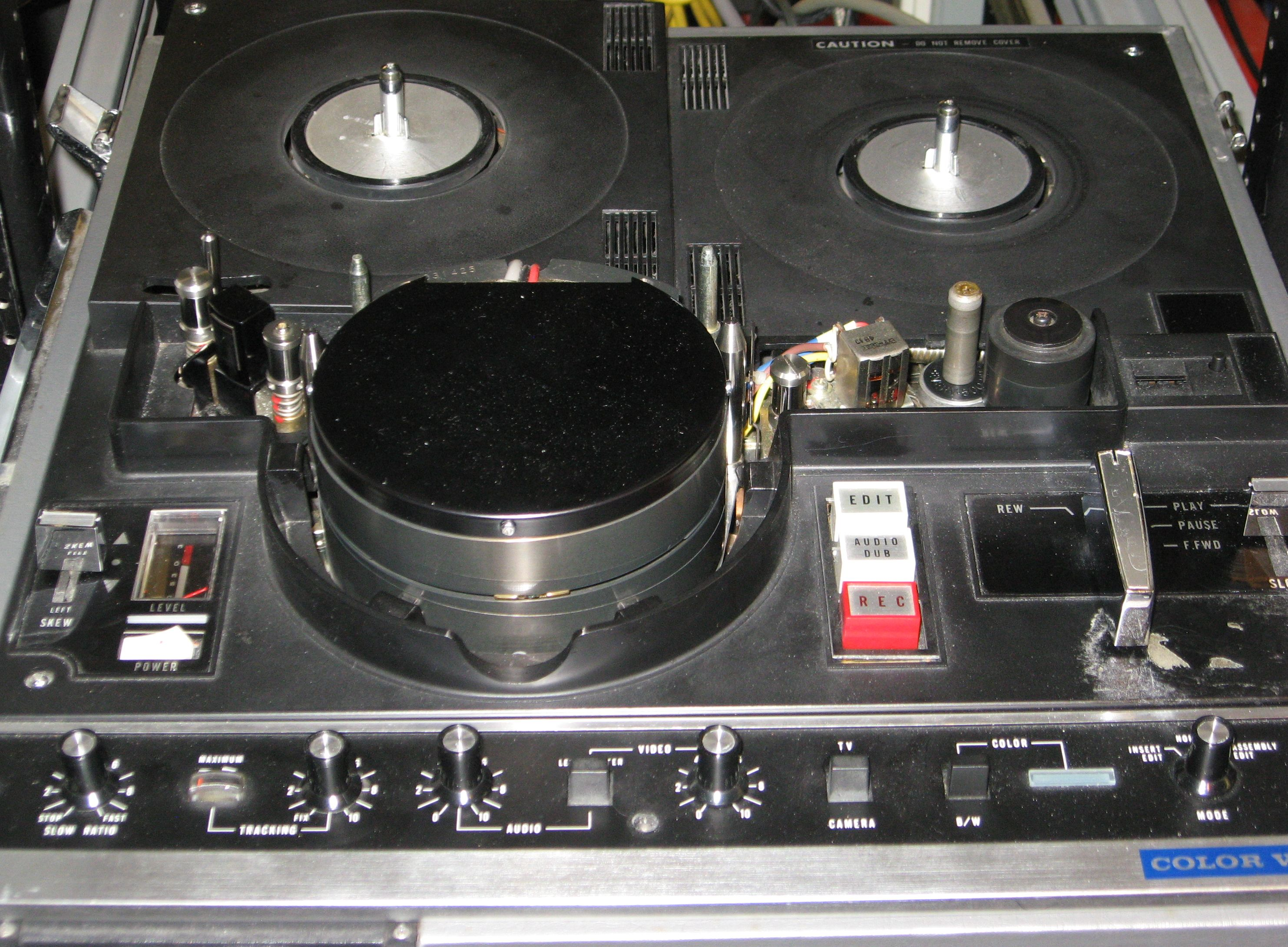
Panasonic 1/2 inch VTR, Model NV3130 at DC Video, ,

== Variations ==
When EIAJ-1 was standardized, no videocassette recorders had yet been introduced. One of the main drawbacks to the format was the need to carefully thread the end of the tape around the head drum, through a gap between the capstan and pinch roller, and around a variety of guides and tensioners. If the user made any errors in doing this, the machine would malfunction and the tape could become damaged. So, another version, EIAJ-2, was released later on that used a single-reel tape cartridge (with the take-up reel being built into the VTR) instead of an open take up reel. Otherwise, the recording specifications were exactly the same.

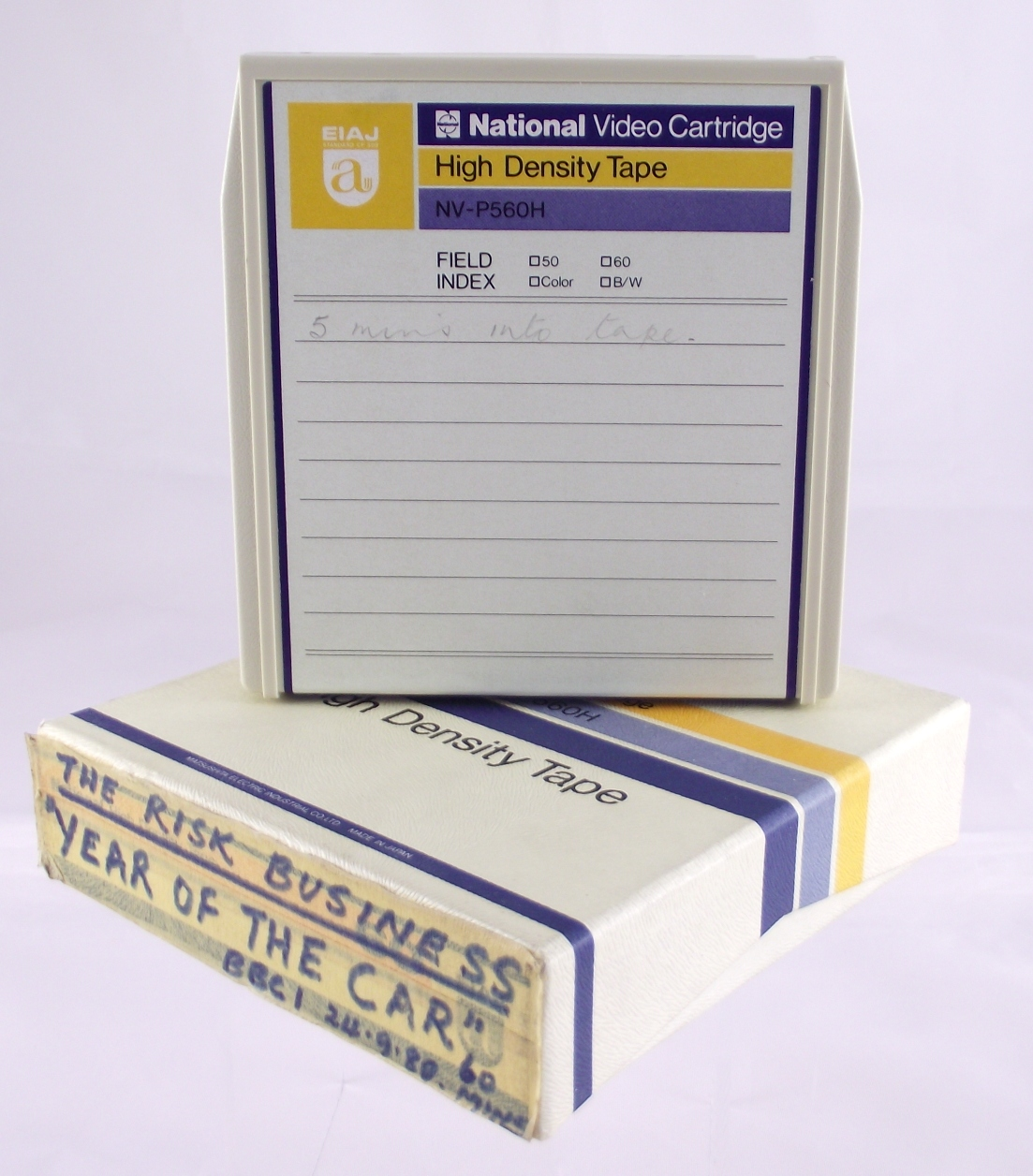
An EIAJ-2 cartridge.

== Successors ==
By 1971, Sony introduced the first successful videocassette system, the U-matic format. The U-Matic system offered many advantages over EIAJ-1, including color recording as standard, stereo sound, and automatic tape threading. However, EIAJ-1 equipment remained in use for some years as it was less expensive than U-Matic machines or tape, EIAJ-1 equipment was lighter and more compact, and portable battery operated EIAJ-1 machines with companion video cameras were already available (such as the AV-3400, mentioned above). It was not until the mid-1970s, that portable U-Matic machines and compatible portable color cameras were introduced.

Neither the EIAJ-1 nor the U-Matic format were ever used in a camcorder (one piece) camera recorder unit, because of the size and weight of the mechanism involved. The recorder and camera were always separate units, connected by a multi conductor cable (typically a CCJ cable). The advent of the camcorder did not occur until the introduction of smaller, lighter cassette formats, such as Betamax and VHS.
