= Cartrivision =

Videocassette format

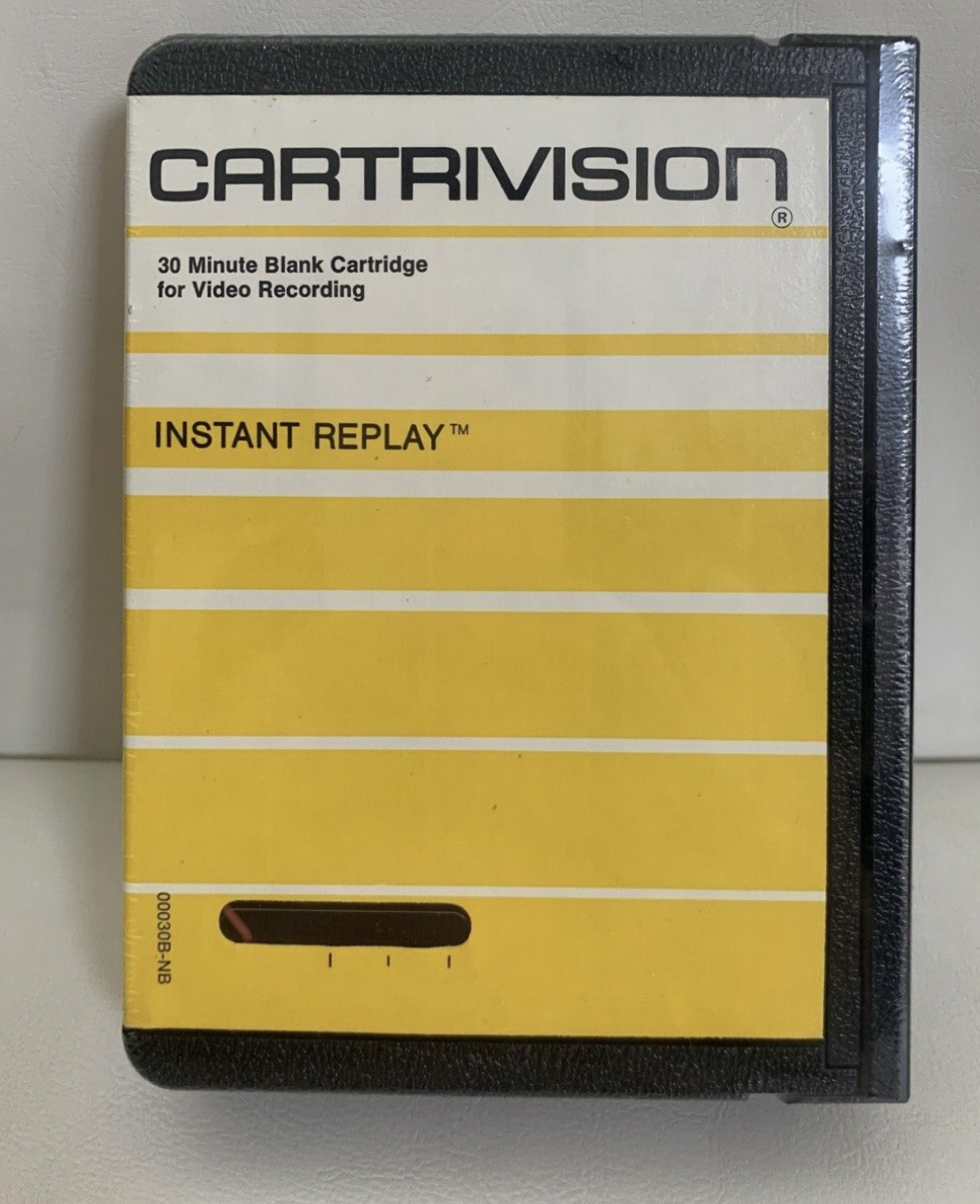
- Cartrivision
- Media type: Magnetic tape cartridge, ½-inch
- Encoding: NTSC, PAL
- Standard: Interlaced video
- Developed by: Avco
- Usage: Home movies
- Released: 1972; 54 years ago

Cartrivision is an analog video tape cartridge format introduced in 1972, and the first format to offer feature films for consumer rental.

Cartrivision was produced by Frank Stanton's Cartridge Television, Inc. (CTI), a subsidiary of Avco, which also owned Embassy Pictures at the time. Cartrivision was available in the form of a TV set with a built-in recorder for the format. Cartrivision recorders and sets were manufactured by Avco, a company that CTI partnered with to manufacture and develop the format, as well as Admiral, Packard Bell, Emerson, Montgomery Ward, and Sears, the latter two marketing Cartrivision sets under their own brand names in their stores. While Montgomery Ward's TV used the Admiral chassis, as did all Montgomery Ward airline TVs, Admiral marketed their own Cartrivision with a different chassis.

The first model of Cartrivision-equipped TV set sold for US $1,350 (equivalent to $9,791 in 2025), and was the first videocassette recorder to have pre-recorded tapes of popular movies available for rent.

== History ==
Avco Corp. introduced Cartrivision at the Consumer Electronics Show in New York in June 1970. It was first sold in June 1972, mainly through Sears, Macy's, and Montgomery Ward department stores in the United States. Manufacture ended thirteen months later in July 1973 after poor sales. Later, it was found that Cartrivision tapes that had been stored in a warehouse had disintegrated due to humidity.

After the demise of Cartrivision in 1973, many Cartrivision-equipped TV sets, separate recording mechanisms, tapes, and other parts and accessories were liquidated by surplus retailers, mainly in California, and many electronic hobbyists bought quite a few of the Cartrivision systems. Some made their own homebrew modifications with the hardware, such as a stand-alone Cartrivision player in its own chassis with an RF modulator to hook it up to any TV set, much like later VCRs.

== Design ==
Like Philips' Video Cassette Recording (VCR) format (introduced at the same time in Europe), the square Cartrivision cassette had the two reels of half-inch magnetic tape mounted on top of each other, but it could record up to 114 minutes. It did so using an open loop helical scan "skip-field" form of video format that recorded every third video field and played it back three times. Citing U.S. patent 3,718,755 "the present invention (of recording and playback) represents an improvement over the prior conventional skip-field systems." Such conventional systems are described in U.S. patent 3,359,365 issued to Kihara on Dec. 19, 1967.

== Retail ==
Cassettes of major movies such as The Bridge on the River Kwai, Guess Who's Coming to Dinner, Dr. Strangelove, High Noon, It Happened One Night, Divorce Italian Style, The Quiet Man, The Belles of St Trinian's, Two Rode Together and Brother Rat were ordered via the initial 200-movie catalog at a retailer, delivered by parcel mail, and then returned to the retailer after viewing. These rental cassettes were red, approximately 7 inches (180 mm) high by 6.5 inches (170 mm) wide by 1.5 inches (38 mm) deep (however used the same videotape used today) and could not be rewound by a home Cartrivision recorder. Rather, they were rewound by a special machine upon their return to the retailer. Other cassettes on sports, travel, art, and how-to topics were available for purchase. These cassettes were black, and could be rewound on a Cartrivision recorder. An optional monochrome camera manufactured for Cartrivision by Eumig could be bought to make home videos. A color camera was in the works but never materialized before CTI's demise.

== See also ==
- List of magnetic tape cartridges and cassettes
