= CV-2000 =

Early home videotape recorder

- Media type: Magnetic tape, ½-inch open reel
- Encoding: 525-lines/60 Hz and 625-lines/50 Hz (not PAL or NTSC as monochrome-only format)
- Read mechanism: Helical scan
- Write mechanism: Helical scan
- Standard: Interlaced video
- Developed by: Sony
- Usage: Home movies
- Released: August 1965

CV-2000 was one of the world's first home video tape recorders (VTR), introduced by Sony in August 1965. The 'CV' in the model name stood for 'Consumer Video' (消費者向けビデオ, shōhishamuke bideo). This was Sony's domestic format throughout the 1960s. It was a forerunner to the first fully transistorized VCR.

The CV-2000 was developed by Sony engineer Nobutoshi Kihara. On its release, the CV-2000D machine was listed for US$695—equivalent to $7,100 in 2025—while a portable version in a more durable case, the CV-2000, was listed for $730—equivalent to $7,458 in 2025. It used 1/2-inch-wide (13 mm) video tape in a reel-to-reel format, meaning the tape had to be manually threaded around the helical scan video head drum. The CV-2000 was one-tenth the weight and price of other analog video recording products of its era. It recorded television programs in black and white with a resolution of more than 220 TVL, using the skip field process, which halved temporal and vertical resolution. The tape moved at a speed of 7.5 inches per second. Two different reels were marketed: A reel of video tape listed for about US$22—equivalent to $225 in 2025—had 30-minute playtime, and video-tape reel listed for about US$40 could hold one hour of video. Although CV-2000 was aimed at the home market, it was mainly used in business and educational institutions.

Ten models were developed in the CV series: CV-2000, TCV-2010, TCV-2020, CV-2100, TCV-2110, TCV-2120, CV-2200, DV-2400, CV-2600 and CV-5100. Sony also sold an optional 'Video Camera Ensemble', known as the VCK-2000. This add-on kit contained a separate video camera, a microphone, and a tripod.

One of its shortcomings as a format was the omission of the ability to adjust tracking, which made interchangeability of tapes between different machines almost impossible. Sony's later AV series machines included this feature. The CV video recorders fell into disuse with the arrival of the EIAJ type 1 standard that was used by many companies, including Sony with their AV series machines.

This video recorder is from before the development of multichannel rotary air-gap transformers, which were commonly used for the spinning heads of VHS recorders, to pass analog video signals across the gap from the spinning upper half to the stationary lower half of the head assembly. This recorder instead uses an earlier slip-ring and brush contact system for the spinning heads, with two sets of brushes to increase signal reliability. However it can still experience video signal quality problems if the metal of the brushes or rings become oxidized / corroded, or coated with dust.
