= Content format =

Data encoding to store and transmit media

Graphical representations of electrical data: analog audio content format (red), 4-bit digital pulse code modulated content format (blue).

A content format is an encoded format for converting a specific type of data to displayable information. Content formats are used in recording and transmission to prepare data for observation or interpretation. This includes both analog and digitized content. Content formats may be recorded and read by either natural or manufactured tools and mechanisms.

In addition to converting data to information, a content format may include the encryption and/or scrambling of that information. Multiple content formats may be contained within a single section of a storage medium (e.g. track, disk sector, computer file, document, page, column) or transmitted via a single channel (e.g. wire, carrier wave) of a transmission medium. With multimedia, multiple tracks containing multiple content formats are presented simultaneously. Content formats may either be recorded in secondary signal processing methods such as a software container format (e.g. digital audio, digital video) or recorded in the primary format (e.g. spectrogram, pictogram).

Observable data is often known as raw data, or raw content. A primary raw content format may be directly observable (e.g. image, sound, motion, smell, sensation) or physical data which only requires hardware to display it, such as a phonographic needle and diaphragm or a projector lamp and magnifying glass.

The following are examples of some common content formats and content format categories (covering: sensory experience, model, and language used for encoding information):

- Document file format
- Audio data encoding
  - Audio coding format
  - Analog audio data
  - Stereophonic sound formats
  - Digital audio data
  - Synthesizer sequences
- Visual data encoding
  - Hand rendering materials
  - Film speed formats
  - Pixel coordinates data
  - Color space data
  - Vector graphic coordinates/dimensions
  - Texture mapping formats
  - 3D display formats
  - Holographic formats
  - Display resolution formatting
  - Text Formats/ Font Size/ Line spacing
- Motion graphics encoding
  - Video coding format
  - Frame rate data
  - Video data
  - Computer animation formats
- Instruction encoding
  - Musical notation
  - Computer language
  - Traffic signals
- Natural languages formats
  - Writing systems
  - Phonetic
  - Sign languages
- Communication signaling formats
- Code formats
- Expert language formats
  - Graphic organizer
  - Statistical model
  - Table of elements
  - DNA sequence
  - Human anatomy
  - Biometric data
  - Chemical formulas
  - Aroma compound
  - Drug chart
  - Electromagnetic spectrum
  - Time standard
  - Numerical weather prediction
  - Capital asset pricing model
  - National income and output
  - Celestial coordinate system
  - Military mapping
  - Geographic information system
  - Interstate Highway System

== See also ==
- Communication
- Representation (arts)
- Content carrier signals
- Content multiplexing format
- Signal transmission
- Wireless content transmission
- Data storage device
- Recording format
- Data compression
- Analog television: NTSC, PAL and SECAM
