= Handycam =

Brand name used by Sony for its camcorder lineup

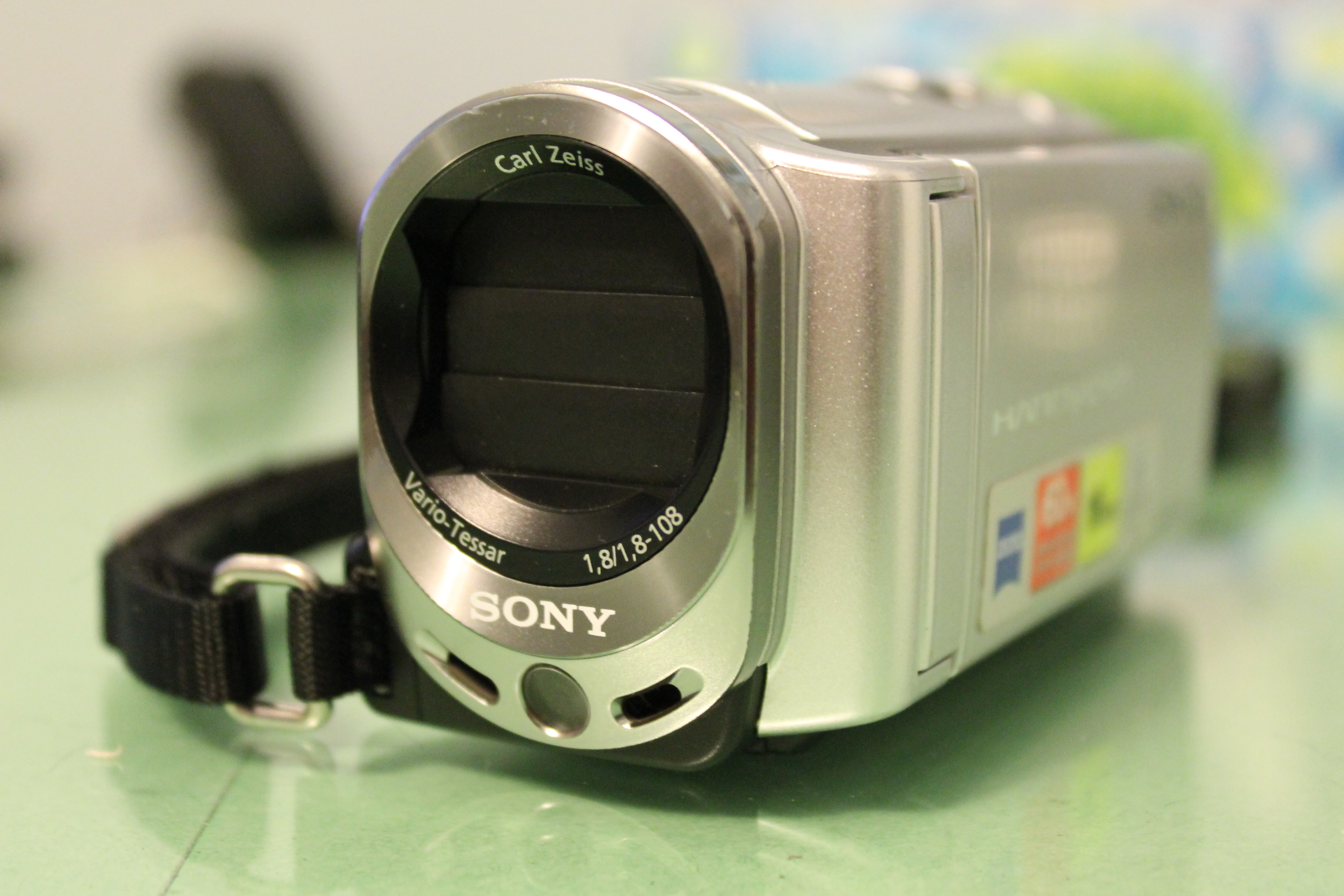
- Sony Handycam DCR-SX63

Overview
- Maker: Sony
- Type: Camcorder
- Released: 1985; 41 years ago

General
- Video recording: Various formats; see § Models
- Made in: Japan

Chronology
- Predecessor: Betamovie

Handycam is a line of camcorders made by Sony and introduced in 1985.

Handycam was first used as the name of the first Video8 camcorder in 1985, replacing Sony's previous line of Betamax-based models of camcorders. The name was intended to emphasize the "handy" palm size nature of the camera, made possible by the then-new miniaturized tape format. This was in contrast to the larger, shoulder mounted cameras made before the creation of Video8, as well as competing smaller formats such as VHS-C.

== Formats ==
Sony has continued to produce Handycams in a variety of guises ever since, developing the Video8 format to produce Hi8 (equivalent to S-VHS quality) and later Digital8, using the same basic format to record digital video. The Handycam label continues to be applied as recording formats evolve, such as adopting the MiniDV, MiniDVD, and MicroMV formats, and then later using hard disk drives and flash memory.

== Functionality ==
=== Night vision ===
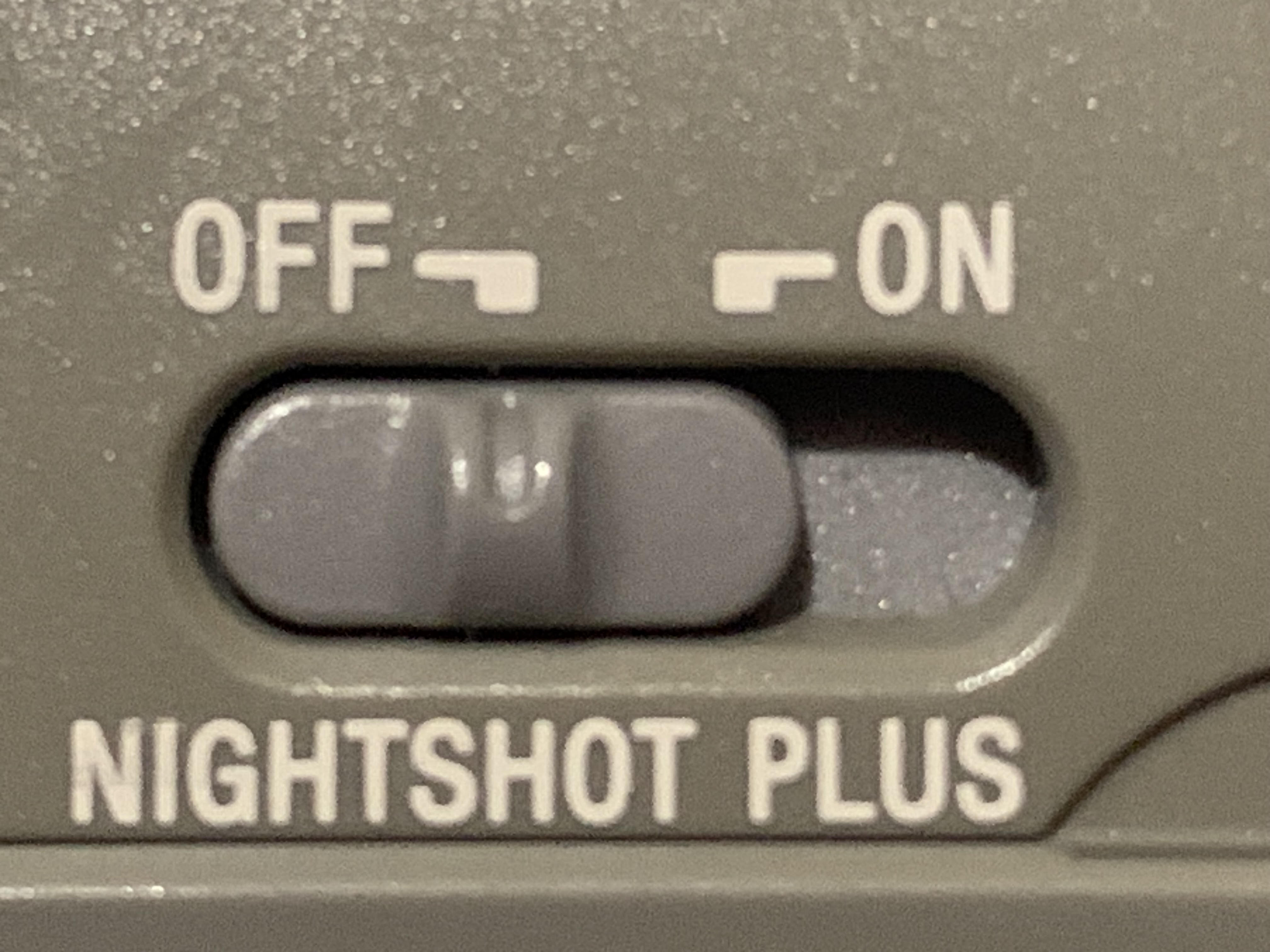
NightShot Plus switch on a Sony Handycam DCR-HC40E

Select flagship Sony Handycam models feature infrared night-vision dubbed NightShot (sometimes referred to as "NightShot Plus" on some models), which utilizes an infrared light-emitting diode and an infrared filter that is mechanically attached and detached to the sensor in order to enable the camcorder to record video footage in complete darkness ("Nightshot 0 lux").

=== Metadata ===
MiniDV tape Handycam camcorders record a time code and video recording parameters (such as light sensitivity (in dB), aperture, exposure time, and info) on an additional meta data track on the tape.

== Models ==
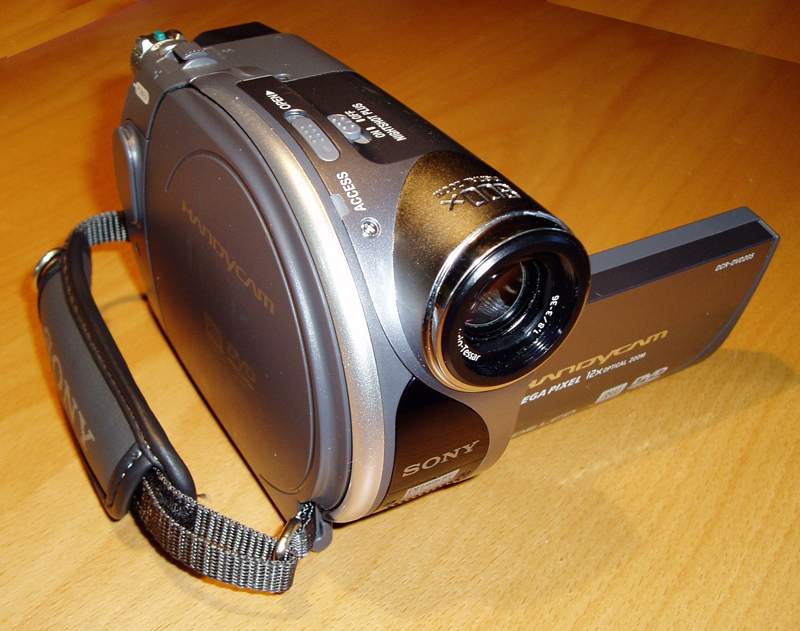
Sony Handycam DCR-DVD705

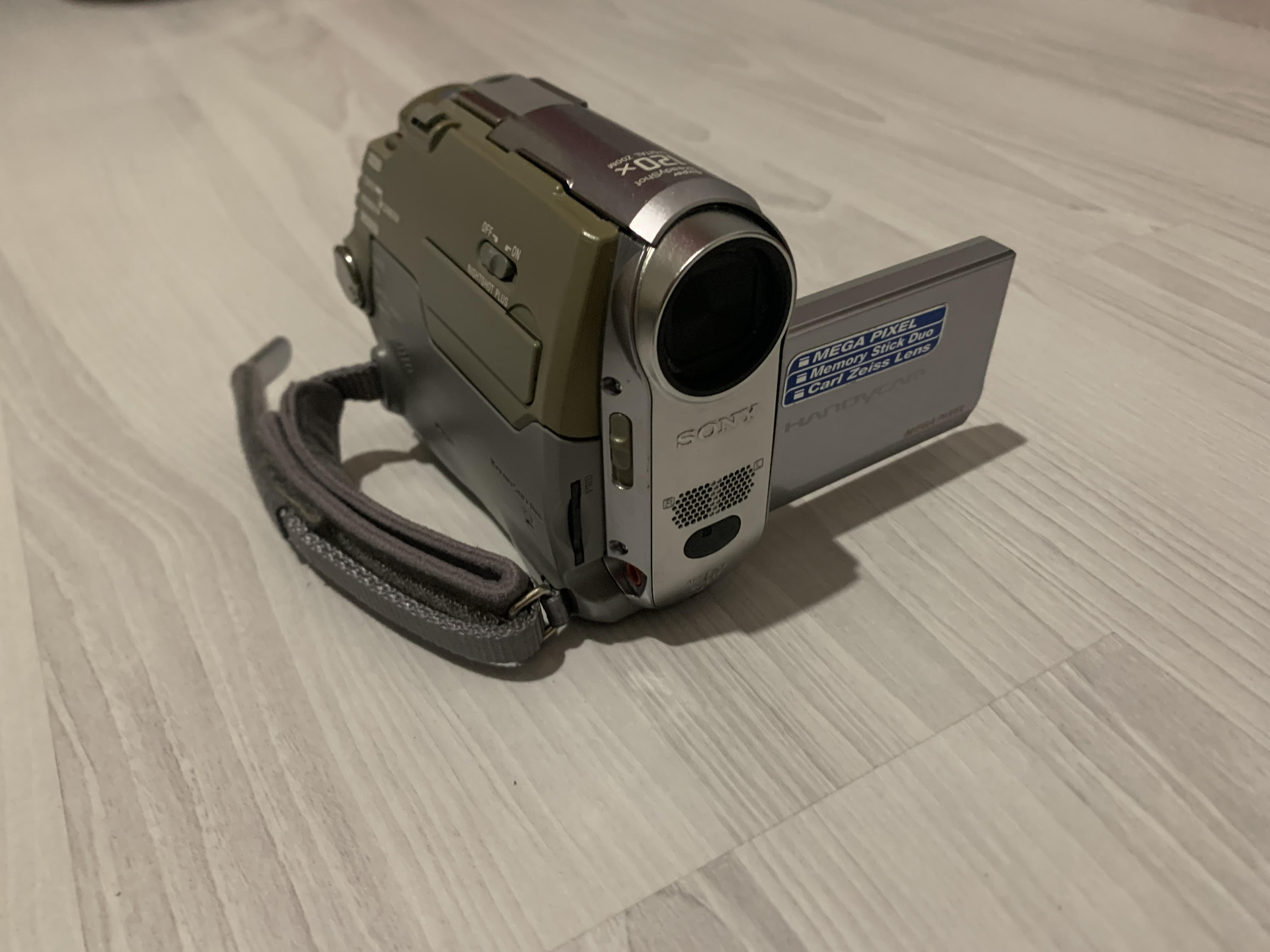
Sony Handycam DCR-HC40E

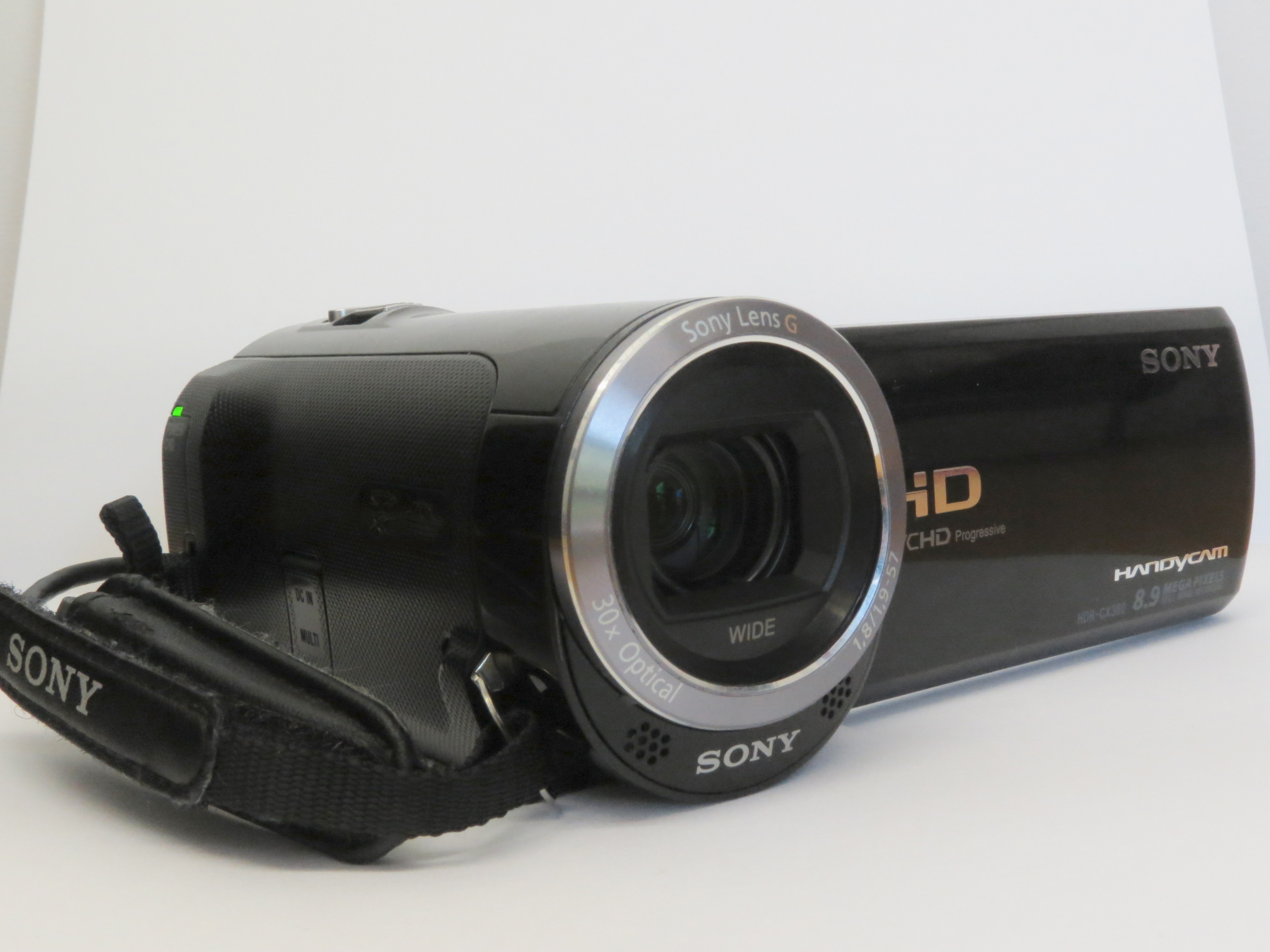
Sony Handycam HDR-CX380

- Video8 Handycam (1985-1989) (These continued for sale into the 90s)
- Hi8 Handycam (1989-2007)
- Digital8 Handycam (1999-2007)
- DV Handycam (1995-2007)
- HDV Handycam (2004-2012)
- DVD-Handycam
- MicroMV Handycam
- HDD Handycam
- Memory Stick Handycam (using Memory Stick Pro Duo. Up to 16GB)
- SD Card Handycam (with or without internal flash memory)
- 4K Handycam

== See also ==
- AVCHD
- Camcorder
- List of Sony trademarks
