= 8 mm video format =

Magnetic tape-based videocassette format for camcorders

8mm video format

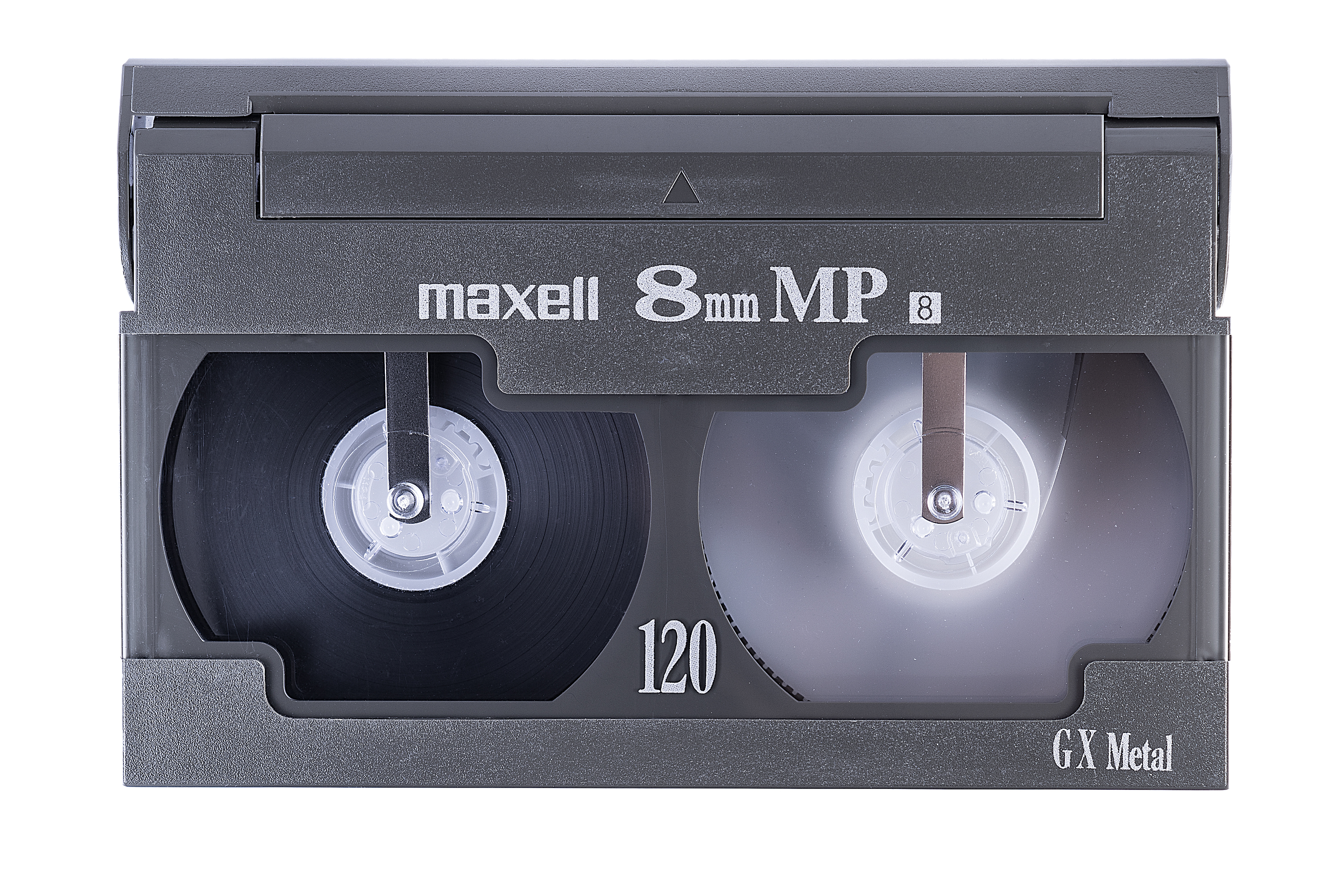
- A Video8 videocassette
- Media type: Magnetic cassette tape
- Encoding: NTSC, PAL, SECAM
- Capacity: Video8/Hi8: 120 minutes (PAL-SP); 240 minutes (PAL-LP); 150 minutes (NTSC-SP); 300 minutes (NTSC-LP); Digital8: 60 minutes (NTSC-SP); 90 minutes (PAL-SP)
- Read mechanism: Helical scan
- Write mechanism: Helical scan
- Standard: 525 lines, 625 lines
- Developed by: Sony and Kodak
- Dimensions: 9.5 × 6.2 × 1.5 cm (3 11/16 × 2 3/8 × 19/32 inch)
- Usage: Home movies
- Extended to: Hi8; Digital8; Data8
- Released: 1984; 42 years ago

The 8mm video format refers informally to three related videocassette formats. These are the original Video8 format (analog video and analog audio but with provision for digital audio), its improved variant Hi8, as well as a more recent digital recording format Digital8. Their user base consisted mainly of amateur camcorder users, although they also saw important use in the professional television production field.

In 1982, five companies – Sony, Matsushita (now Panasonic), JVC, Hitachi, and Philips – created a preliminary draft of the unified format and invited members of the Electronic Industries Association of Japan, the Magnetic Tape Industry Association, the Japan Camera Industry Association and other related associations to participate. As a result, a consortium of 127 companies endorsed 8-mm video format in April 1984.

In January 1984, Eastman Kodak announced the new technology in the U.S. In 1985, Sony of Japan introduced the Handycam, one of the first Video8 cameras with commercial success. Much smaller than the competition's VHS and Betamax video cameras, Video8 became very popular in the consumer camcorder market.

== History ==
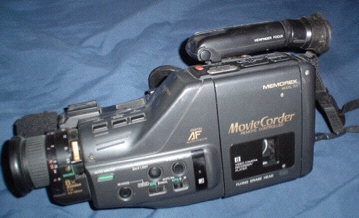
An amateur grade Video8 Camcorder from the early 1990s

=== Video8 ===
Video8 was launched in 1984, into a market dominated by the VHS-C and Betamax formats. The first two models were the Kodak Kodavision 2200 and 2400, both over US$1,500. The Kodak machines were produced by Matsushita Electric, but Matsushita itself had shown no interest in selling the same product under its own name.

The first Sony camcorder capable of recording to standard 8mm videotape was the Sony CCD-V8, with 6× zoom but only manual focus, released in 1985 with an MSRP of approximately $1,175, ($3,517 in 2025) and a mass of 1.97 kg (4.3 lb). The same year, Sony released the CCD-V8AF which added autofocus. Also in 1985, Sony released the first of their compact Handycam range: the CCD-M8, which at one kilogram was half the mass of the CCD-V8, though it had no zoom and supported only manual focus with three focus settings.

In April 1986 six Japanese electronics companies—Matsushita, Hitachi, Pentax, Minolta, Mitsubishi, Sharp and Toshiba—announced their lack of plans to embrace eight millimeter in the foreseeable future and instead adopted VHS-C format. Yet, several months later at the summer 1986 Consumer Electronics Show Olympus introduced an eight-millimeter camcorder manufactured by Matsushita, and Hitachi was reported to be making eight-millimeter machines for Minolta & Pentax.

Video8 offers similar video quality to Beta-II and VHS in their standard-play modes.

In terms of audio, Video8 generally outperforms its older rivals. Audio on Standard VHS and Beta is recorded along a narrow linear track at the edge of the tape, where it is vulnerable to damage. Coupled with the slow horizontal tape speed, the sound was comparable with that of a low-quality audio cassette. By contrast, all Video8 machines used audio frequency modulation (AFM) to record sound along the same helical tape path as that of the video signal. This meant that Video8's standard audio was of a far higher quality than that of its rivals. Early Video8 camcorders used mono AFM sound, but this was later made stereo. This cost less than including 8mm's optional digital stereo audio track. Linear audio did have the advantage that (unlike either AFM system) it could be re-recorded without disturbing the video, doing this in 8mm required a deck that supported digital audio. While full sized VHS machines often provided AFM stereo recording, (VHS HiFi), it was much less common on consumer-grade VHS-C camcorders.

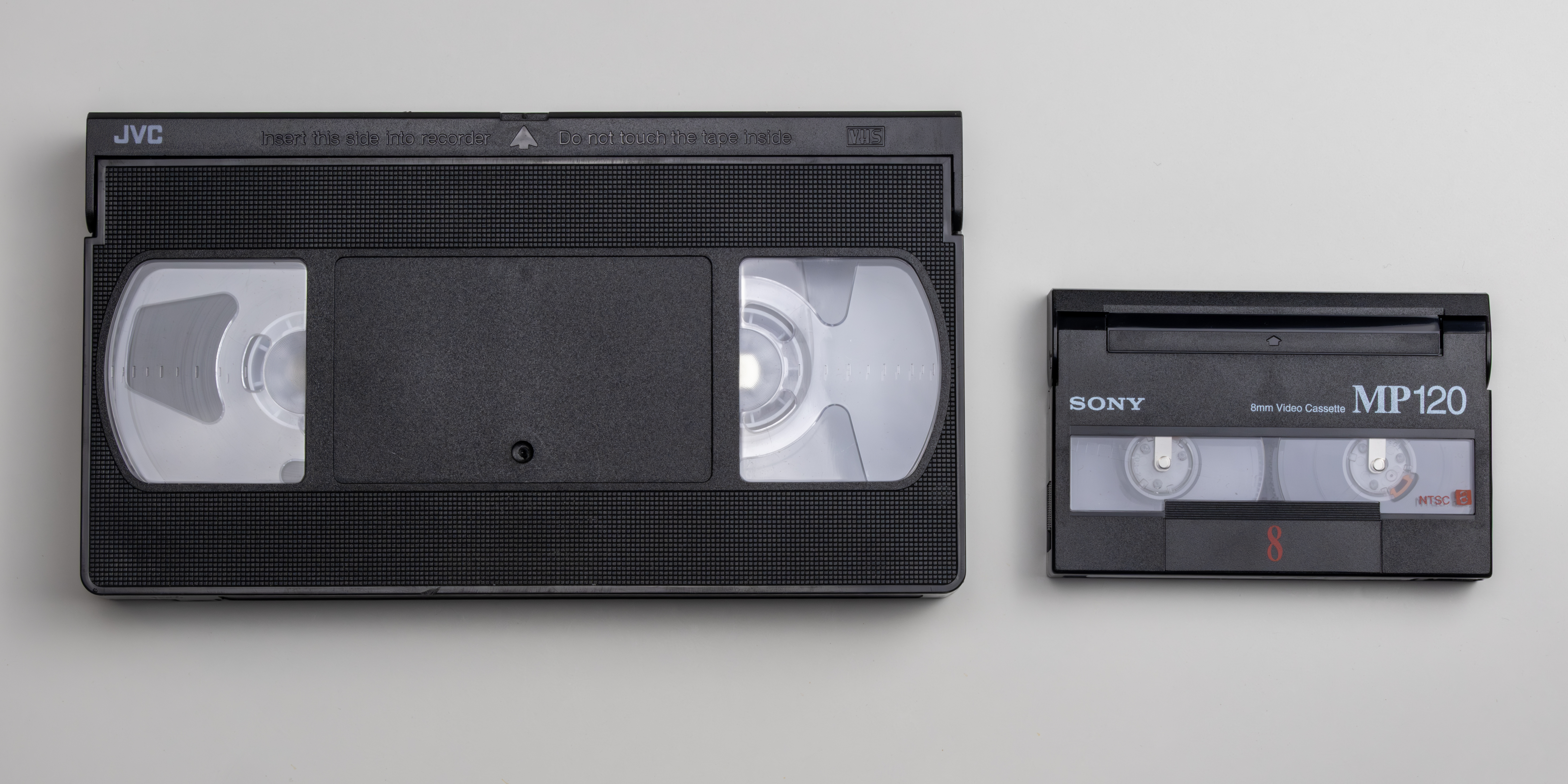
A full-size VHS tape (left) compared with a Video8 tape (right)

The small size of media means that many Video8 camcorders are small enough to hold in the palm of the user's hand. This was impossible with Betamax and full-sized VHS camcorders, with all of them having shoulder-mount form factor.

Video8 also has an advantage in terms of recording and playback time over VHS-C – 180 minutes vs 45 minutes in SP mode for standard cassettes for each format.

Video8/Hi8's main drawback is that tapes made with Video8 camcorders cannot be played on VHS hardware. Instead it was assumed that the camcorder would be directly plugged into one's TV. Although it is possible to transfer tapes (using the VCR to rerecord the source video as it is played back by the camcorder), the VHS copy would lose some quality compared to the 8mm original. During the 1990s Sony did market a few VHS VCRs that also feature an 8mm deck to allow convenient transfer to VHS. GoldStar also made a similar dual-deck machine.

Ultimately, Video8's main rival in the camcorder market turned out to be VHS-C, with neither dominating the market completely. However, both formats (along with their improved descendants, Hi8 and S-VHS-C) were nevertheless very successful. Collectively, they dominated the camcorder market for almost two decades before they were eventually crowded out by digital formats, such as MiniDV, 8cm DVD.

=== Hi8 ===
Logo of Hi8

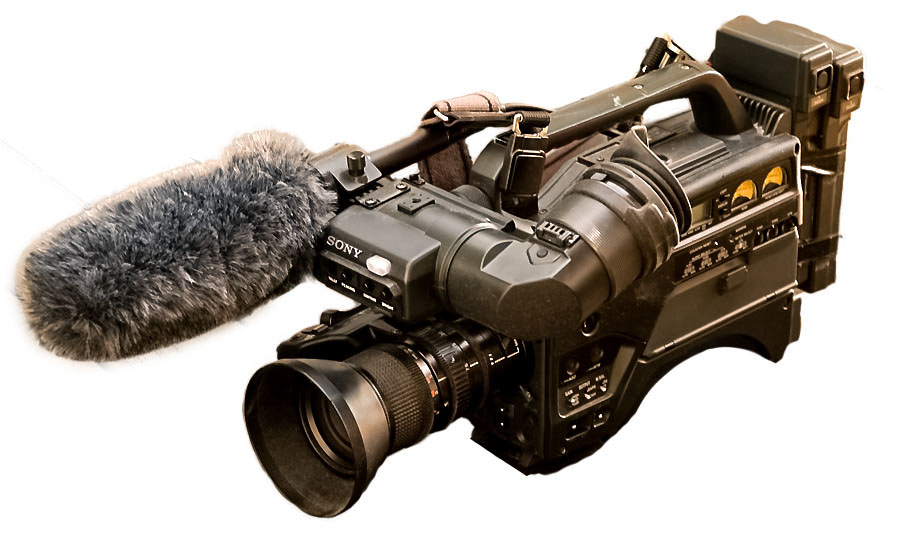
A professional-grade ENG/EFP field Hi8 camcorder. Sony EVW-300

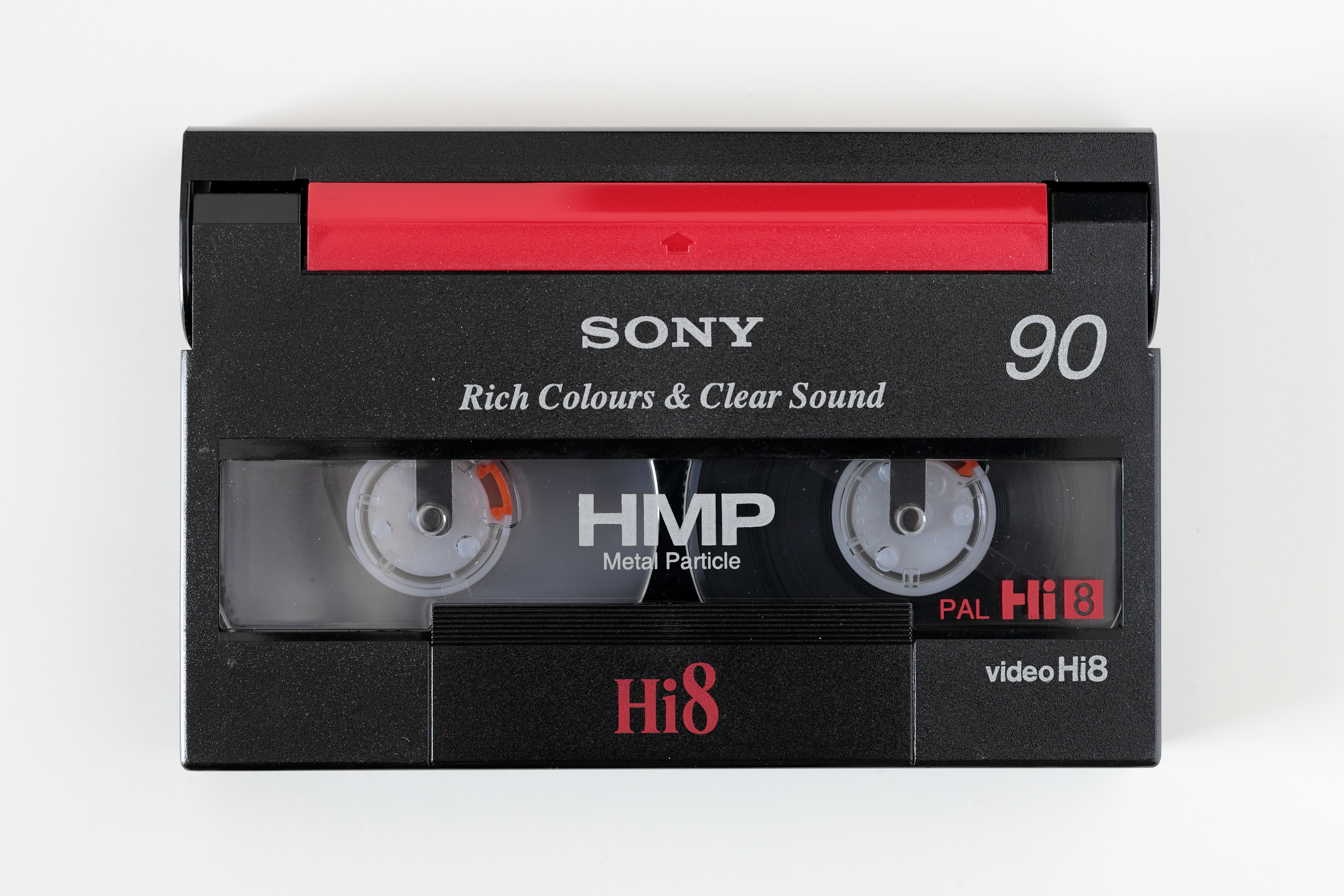
A Sony Hi8 videocassette

To counter the Super-VHS format, Sony introduced Video Hi8 (short for high-band Video8). First demonstrated in February 1989, it was initially endorsed by ten other manufacturers — Aiwa, Canon, Fuji, Hitachi, Konica, Matsushita, Maxell, Ricoh, Sanyo and TDK, which were joined later by Nikon, Samsung, Sharp and TEAC. Japanese companies produced camcorders for other brands like Fisher and Siemens.

Similar to S-VHS, Hi8 used improved recorder electronics and media formulation to increase the recorded bandwidth of the luminance signal. The luminance carrier was shifted from 4.2 MHz for regular 8-mm up to 5.7 MHz for Hi8, and the frequency deviation was increased to 2 MHz from the 1.2 MHz of standard 8-mm.

Like S-VHS, Hi8 was officially rated at a luminance resolution of 400 lines, a vast improvement from their respective base formats and are roughly equal to LaserDisc quality. Chrominance resolution remained unchanged.

Sony retained monaural AFM and stereo digital PCM audio in its initial offerings, while Canon introduced HiFi AFM Stereo with the A1. HiFi AFM Stereo improved the original AFM audio format, making it stereo; it was also cheaper than digital PCM. Sony accepted HiFi AFM Stereo for its future mid-range models and relegated digital PCM audio to top of the line camcorders and VCRs.

All Hi8 equipment can record and play the standard 8-mm video. The reverse is not usually the case though a few late-entry 8-mm systems recognize and play Hi8 recordings.

=== PCM Multi Audio ===
The Sony EV-S900 (Hi8), Sony EV-S800, Sony EV-S700U, and Pioneer VE-D77 (Video8) all support a mode called "PCM Multi Audio Recording". While other 8mm decks support only a single stereo PCM recording, these units provide five additional stereo PCM tracks that are recorded in the video area of the signal. This allows 8mm tapes to hold 6 parallel tracks of audio, each up to 4 hours long (in LP mode). Only one stereo track can be recorded or listened to at a time, and tracks are selected with the "PCM Multi Audio" selector button.

=== Digital8 ===
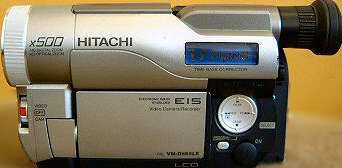
Hitachi Digital8 Camcorder

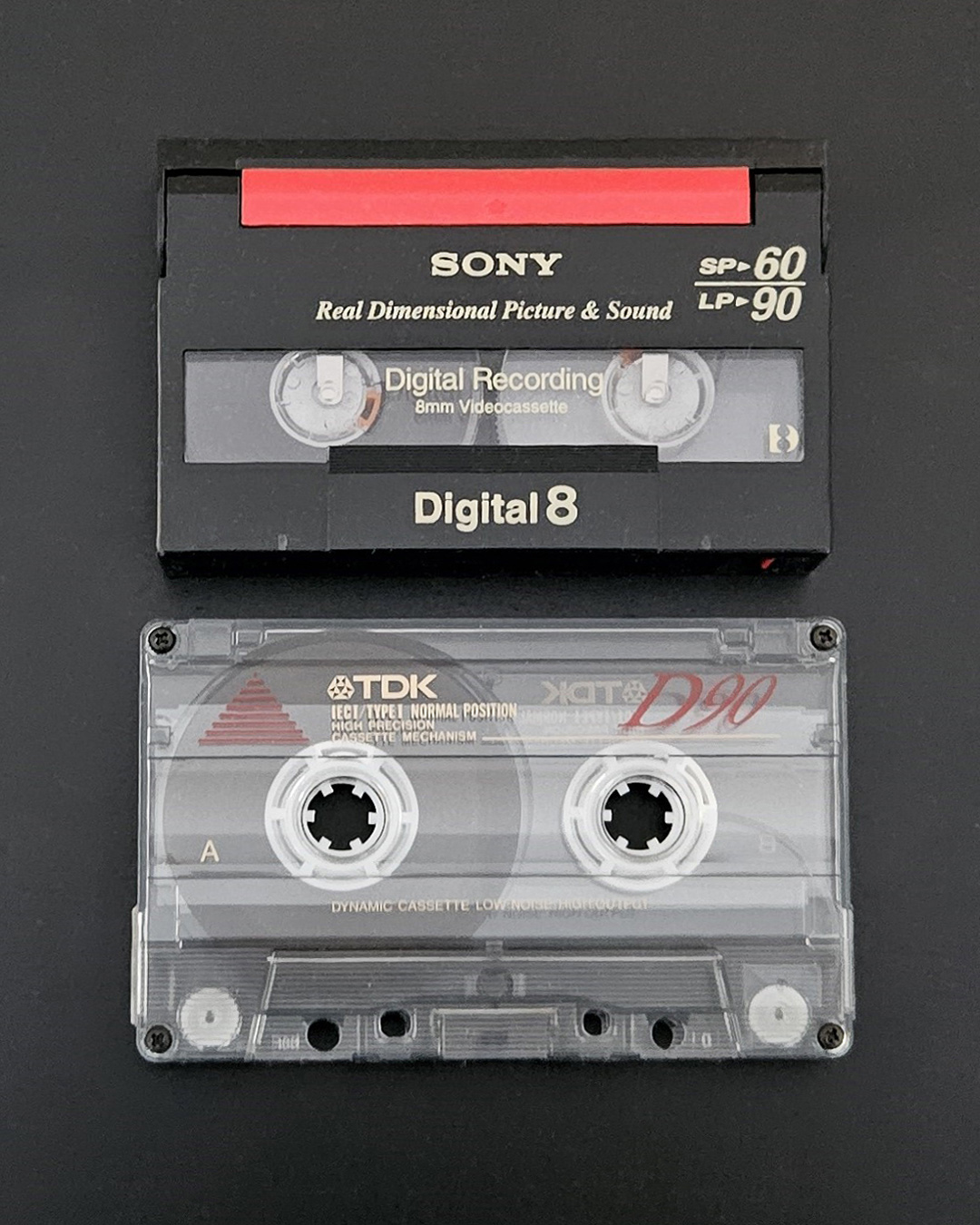
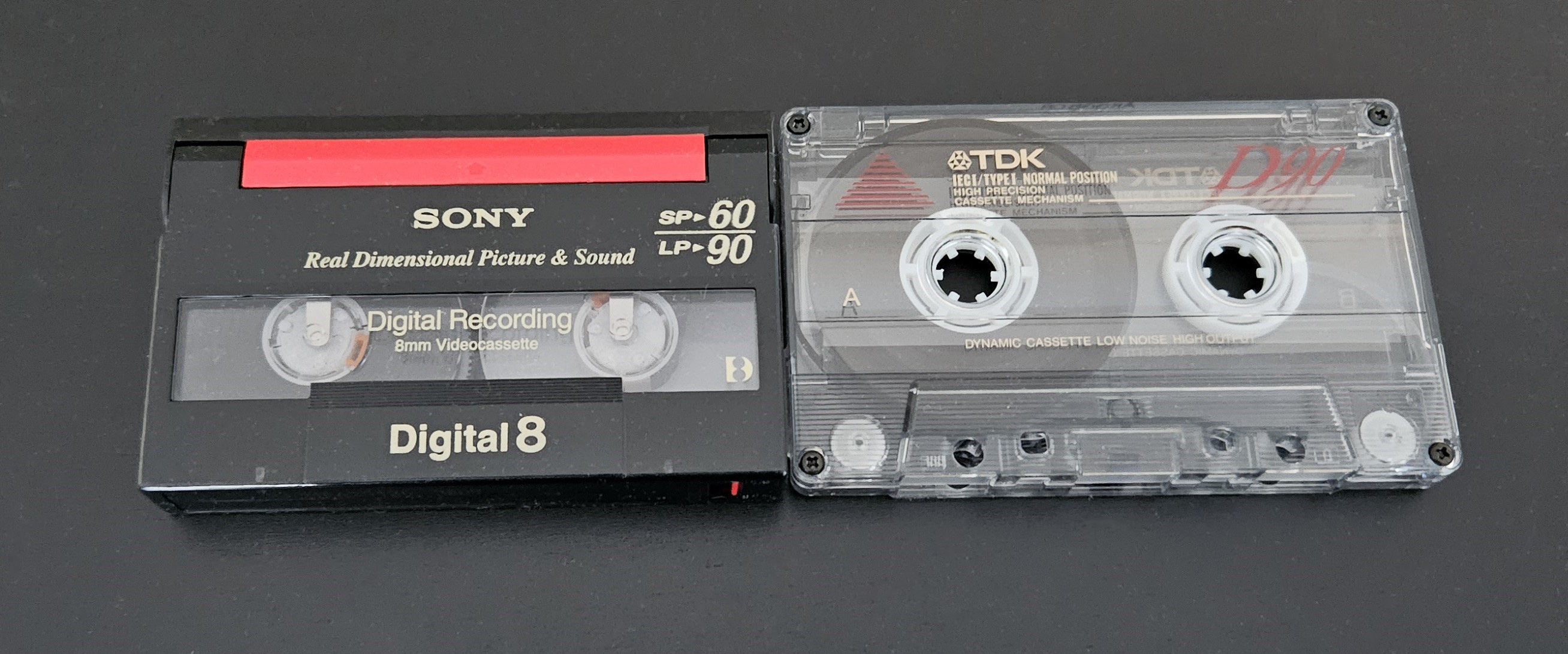
8-mm videocassette compared to Compact Cassette

Introduced in 1999, Digital8 is a form of the industry standard DV codec, recorded on Hi8 media. In engineering terms, Digital8 and MiniDV are indistinguishable at the logical format level. To store the digitally encoded audio/video on a standard NTSC Video8 cassette, the tape must be run at double the Hi8 speed. Thus, a 120-minute NTSC Hi8 tape yields 60 minutes of Digital8 video. Most Digital8 units offer an LP mode, which increases the recording time on an NTSC P6-120 tape to 90 minutes.

For PAL, the Digital8 recorder runs 1½ times faster; thus, a 90-minute PAL Hi8 tape yields 60 minutes of Digital8 video. PAL LP mode returns the tape speed to the Hi8 SP speed, so a Hi8 90-minute tape yields 90 minutes of Digital8 video.

Sony has licensed Digital8 technology to at least one other firm (Hitachi), which marketed a few models for a while; but by 2005 only Sony sold Digital8 consumer equipment. Digital8's main rival is the consumer MiniDV format, which uses narrower tape and a correspondingly smaller cassette shell. Since both technologies share the same logical audio/video format, Digital8 can theoretically equal MiniDV or even DVCAM in A/V performance. But by the year 2005, Digital8 had been relegated to the entry-level camcorder market.

Digital8 recordings are not interchangeable with analog recordings, although many models of Digital8 equipment are able to play Hi8/Video8 analog recordings.

=== Decline ===
By 2009, the popularity of the analog 8mm formats had dwindled considerably and new camcorders that support the format were unobtainable, having been superseded by digital formats, mainly MiniDV and 8 cm DVD. These in turn have been largely displaced by high-definition camcorders that record to flash storage cards. Both Video8 and Hi8 blank media remain available and affordable but are increasingly rare. Tape-based camcorders are still readily available in the secondhand market. The last Hi8 camcorder (the Sony CCD-TRV238) and the last Digital8 camcorder (the Sony DCR-TRV280 (NTSC) / DCR-TRV285 (PAL)) were both discontinued in 2007, ending the 8mm format's 22 years on the market.

== Design ==
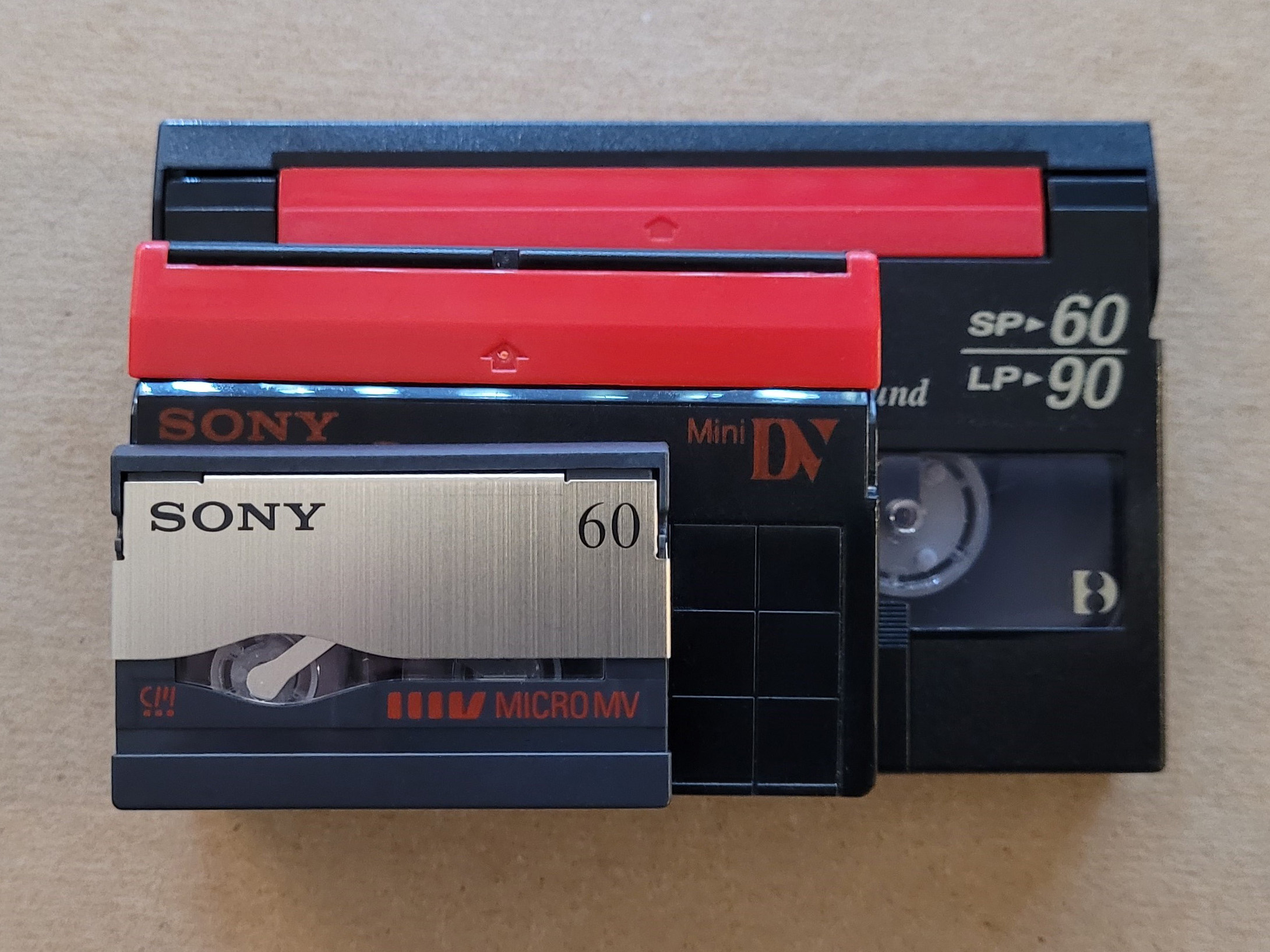
8-mm videocassette compared to MiniDV and MicroMV

The three formats are physically very similar, featuring both the same magnetic tape width and near-identical cassette shells, measuring 95 × 62.5 × 15 mm. This gives a measure of backward compatibility in some cases. One difference between them is in the quality of the tape itself, but the main differences lie in the encoding of the video when it is recorded onto the tape.

Video8 was the earliest of the three formats, and is entirely analog (excluding the optional digital PCM audio). The 8mm tape width was chosen as smaller successor to the 12mm Betamax format, using similar technology (including U-shaped tape loading) but in a smaller configuration in response to the small configuration VHS-C compact camcorders introduced by the competition. It was followed by Hi8, a version with improved resolution.

Digital8 is the most recent 8mm video format. It retains the same physical cassette shell as its predecessors, and can even record onto Video8 (not recommended) or Hi8 cassettes. However, the format in which video is encoded and stored on the tape itself is the entirely digital DV format (and thus very different from the analog Video8 and Hi8). Some Digital8 camcorders support Video8 and Hi8 with analog sound (for playback only), but this is not required by the Digital8 specification.

In all three cases, a length of 8mm-wide magnetic tape is wound between two spools and contained within a hard-shell cassette. These cassettes share similar size and appearance with the audio cassette, but their mechanical operation is far closer to that of VHS or Betamax videocassettes. Standard recording time is up to 90 minutes for PAL and 120 minutes for NTSC. These times are doubled for Long Play (LP) recording mode. (The cassette holds the same length tape; tape consumption is different between PAL and NTSC recorders.) Longer tapes were available, but were less common.

Like most other videocassette systems, Video8 uses a helical-scan head drum (it having a small 40mm head) to read from and write to the magnetic tape. The drum rotates at high speed (one or two rotations per picture frame—about 1800 or 3600 rpm for NTSC, and 1500 or 3000 rpm for PAL) while the tape is pulled along the drum's path. Because the tape and drum are oriented at a slight angular offset, the recording tracks are laid down as parallel diagonal stripes on the tape.

The heads on the drum of a Video8 recorder move across the tape at (a writing speed of) 3.75 meters per second.

Unlike preceding systems, 8mm did not use a control track on the tape to facilitate the head following the diagonal tracks. Instead 8mm recorded a sequence of four sine waves on each video track such that adjacent tracks would produce one of two heterodyne frequencies if the head mistracked. The system automatically adjusted the tracking such that the two frequencies produced were of equal magnitude. This system was derived from the dynamic track following (DTF) used by the Philips Video 2000 system. Sony rechristened the system as automatic track following (ATF) as the 8mm system lacked the ability of the heads to physically move within the head drum.

The main disadvantage of the ATF system was that unlike in the case of a control track, an 8mm camera or player cannot keep track of where the tape is during fast forward and rewind (though it could during shuttle search). This made editing using a linear editing system problematic. Some later cameras and players attempted to derive the tape position from the differential rotation of the spools with limited success.

=== Tape and recording protection ===
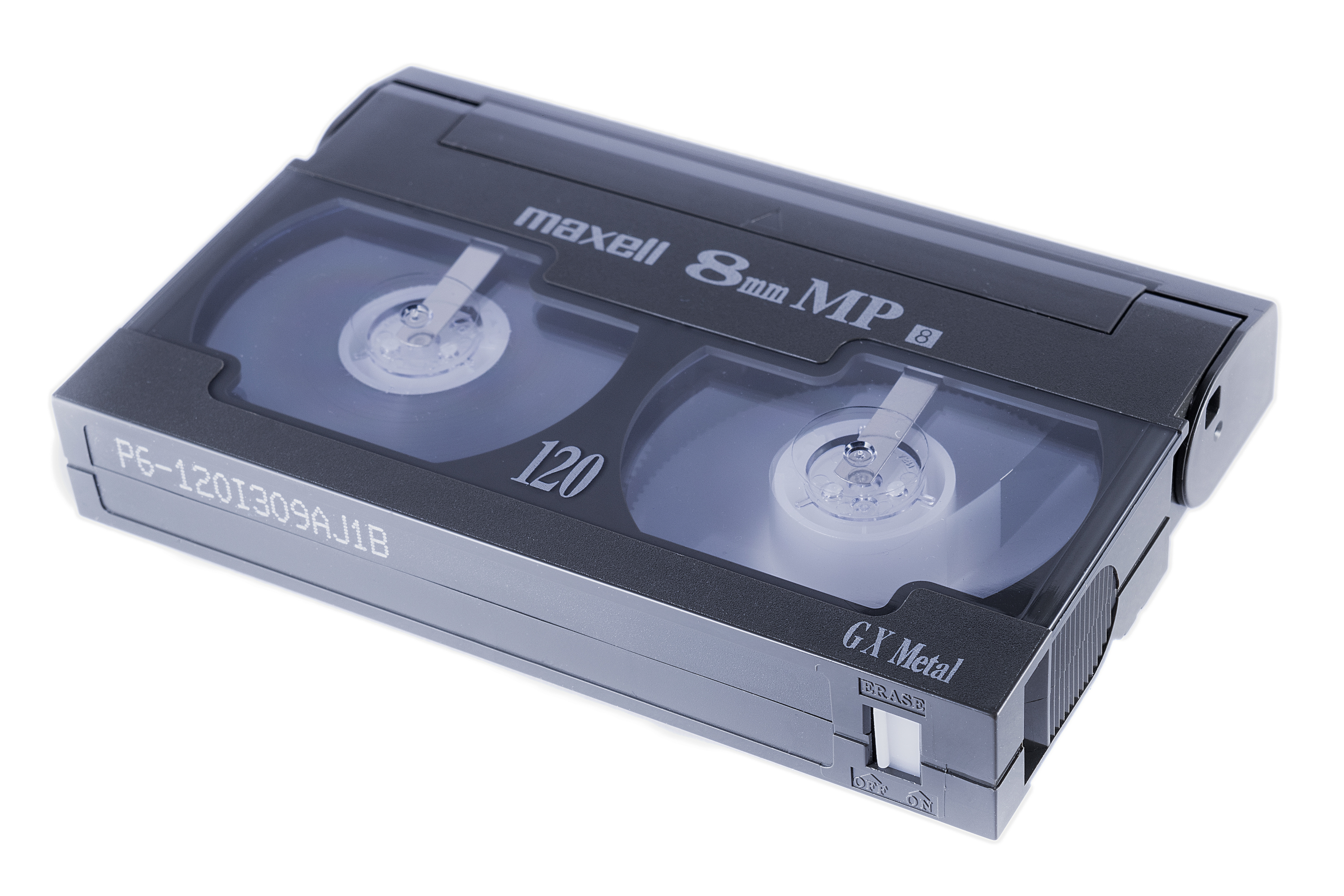
The write-protect switch (right) prevents accidental erasure

As with many other video cassette formats, 8mm videocassettes have a tape-protecting mechanism built into the shell. Unlike the ones on VHS and VHS-C shells, which consist of only a single piece of plastic that protects the part of the tape that is read by the player/recorder, Hi8's tape-protection mechanism consists of two pieces of plastic at the top of the shell that come together and form a casing that protects both sides of the tape, and a latch that prevents this casing from opening and exposing the tape. The playback/recording unit can depress this latch to open the casing and gain access to the tape.

To prevent the recording on the tape from being erased, there is a small write-protect tab that can be moved to one of two positions, labeled "REC" and "SAVE" (sometimes marked as "ERASE ON" and "OFF", respectively). Comparing the sliding tab to a door, the tape is in the "REC" position when the "door" is open and in the "SAVE" position when it is closed. (Not all tape cases have markings for this information.) The tape can only be recorded onto (or recorded over) when this tab is in the "REC" position. This is an improved version of the VHS write-protect tab, which prevents erasure after it has been broken off, requiring covering with adhesive tape or filling with an obstruction to remove the write protection.

== Non-camcorder use ==
=== Home market ===
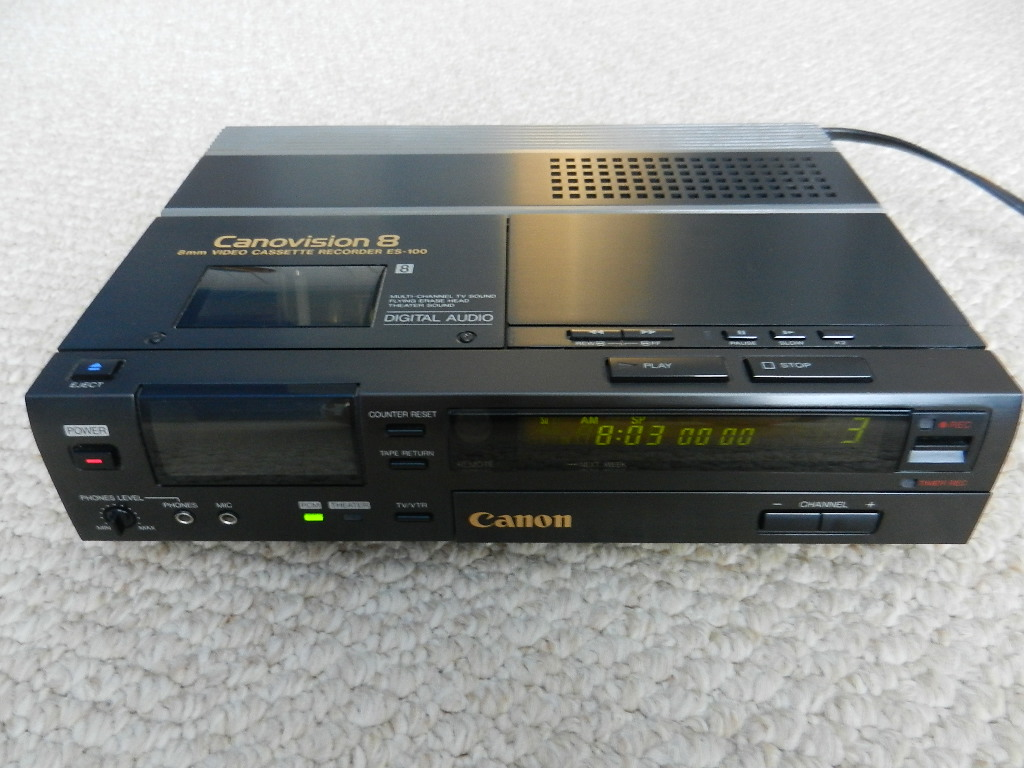
Canon ES-100A: High-end Video 8 VCR based on the Sony EV-S1

Efforts were made to expand Video8 from only the camcorder market into mainstream home video. But as a replacement for full-size VCRs, Video8 failed. It lacks the long (5+ hours) recording times of both VHS and Betamax, offers no clear audio/video improvement, and cost more than equivalent full-size VCRs. Even with all of the advanced features offered in high-end Video8 machines, there was no compelling reason to switch to Video8 for the home application.

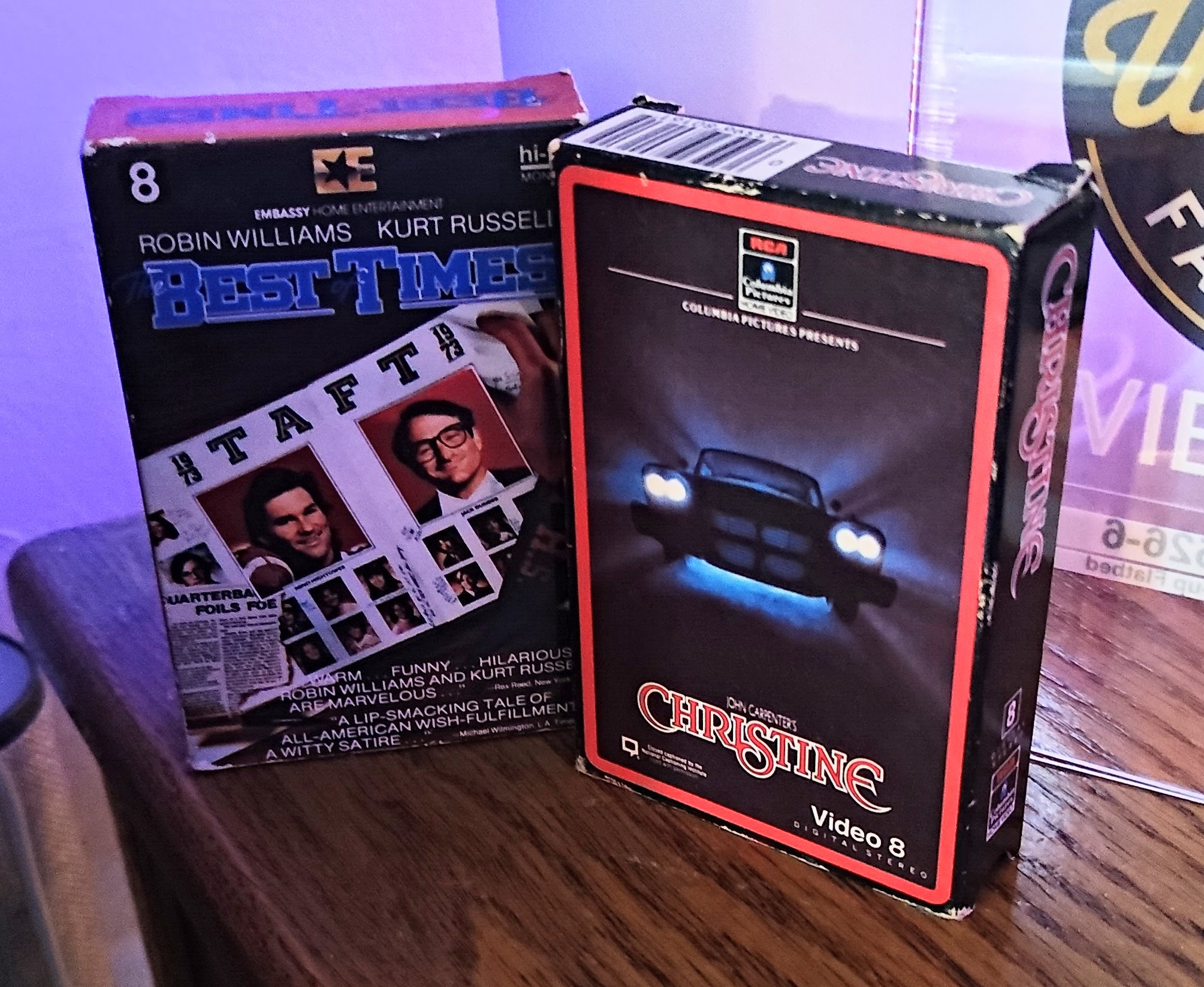
Two Video8 home releases

Initially, many movies were prerecorded in 8mm format for home and rental use, but the rental market for Video8 never materialized. Sony maintained a line of Video8 home VCRs well into the 1990s, but unlike VHS, 8mm VCRs with timers were very expensive.

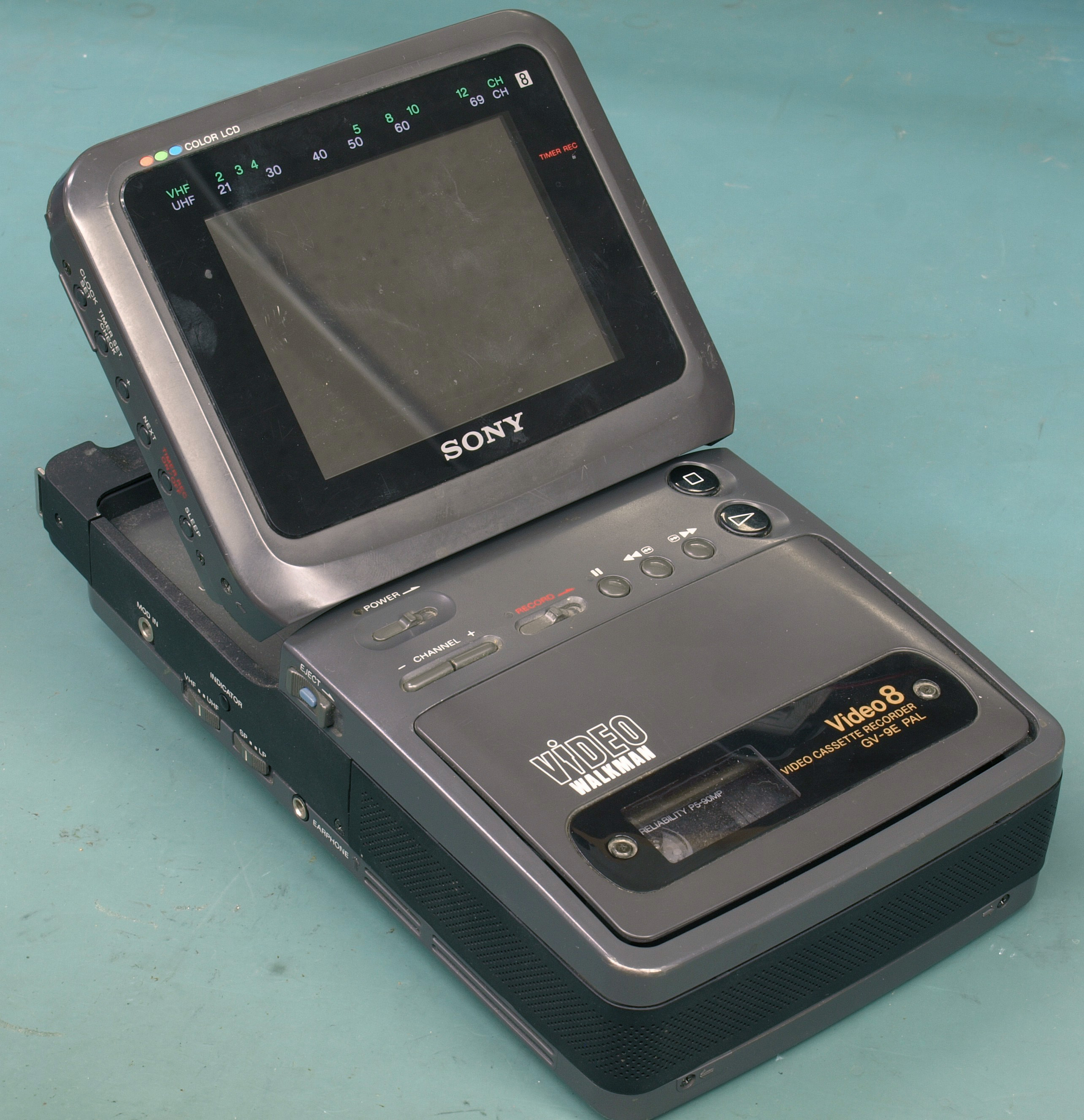
Video Walkman

Sony also produced a line of Video8 Walkman-branded players and recorders, with and without a flip-up screen meant for video playback and limited recording. These have been adapted for Digital8 as well as MiniDV formats, even as portable DVD players have become popular in this application. Such players saw use in professional applications, particularly with airlines, which, during the 1980s, adopted 8mm as the format for in-flight movies. They remained in use among some airlines until at least 2015.

=== Videography ===
Among home and amateur videographers, Video8/Hi8 was popular enough for Sony to make equipment for video editing and production. The format also saw some use in professional electronic news gathering and electronic field production.

=== Professional 8-track audio ===
TASCAM used Hi8 tapes to develop an 8-track professional digital audio format called DTRS (Digital Tape Recording System). The format was first used in the DA-88 and similar models. While the cassettes are physically interchangeable, these recordings are not interchangeable with 8mm video formats.

== See also ==
- Data8
- Ruvi
