= VHS-C =

Magnetic tape-based format

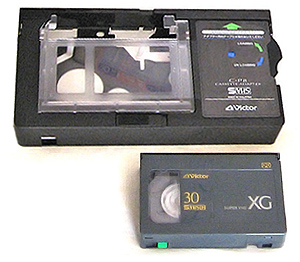
- VHS-C cassette adapter (top) and VHS-C cassette (bottom)
- Media type: Magnetic cassette tape, 1/2-inch (13 mm)
- Encoding: NTSC, PAL, SECAM
- Capacity: 30, 60 minutes
- Read mechanism: Helical scan
- Write mechanism: Helical scan
- Standard: 525 lines, 625 lines
- Dimensions: 92 × 58 × 20 mm (3 5/8 × 2 1/4 × 3/4 in)
- Usage: Home movies
- Extended from: VHS
- Released: 1982; 44 years ago

VHS-C is a compact version of the VHS videocassette format, introduced by Victor Company of Japan (JVC) in 1982, and used primarily in consumer-grade analog recording camcorders. VHS-C uses the same magnetic tape as full-size VHS cassettes and can be played in a regular VHS VCR using an adapter. An improved version named S-VHS-C was also developed. VHS-C's main competitor was Sony's Video8 format, but both were eventually displaced in the consumer market by the digital MiniDV format, which offered a smaller form factor.

== Technical info ==
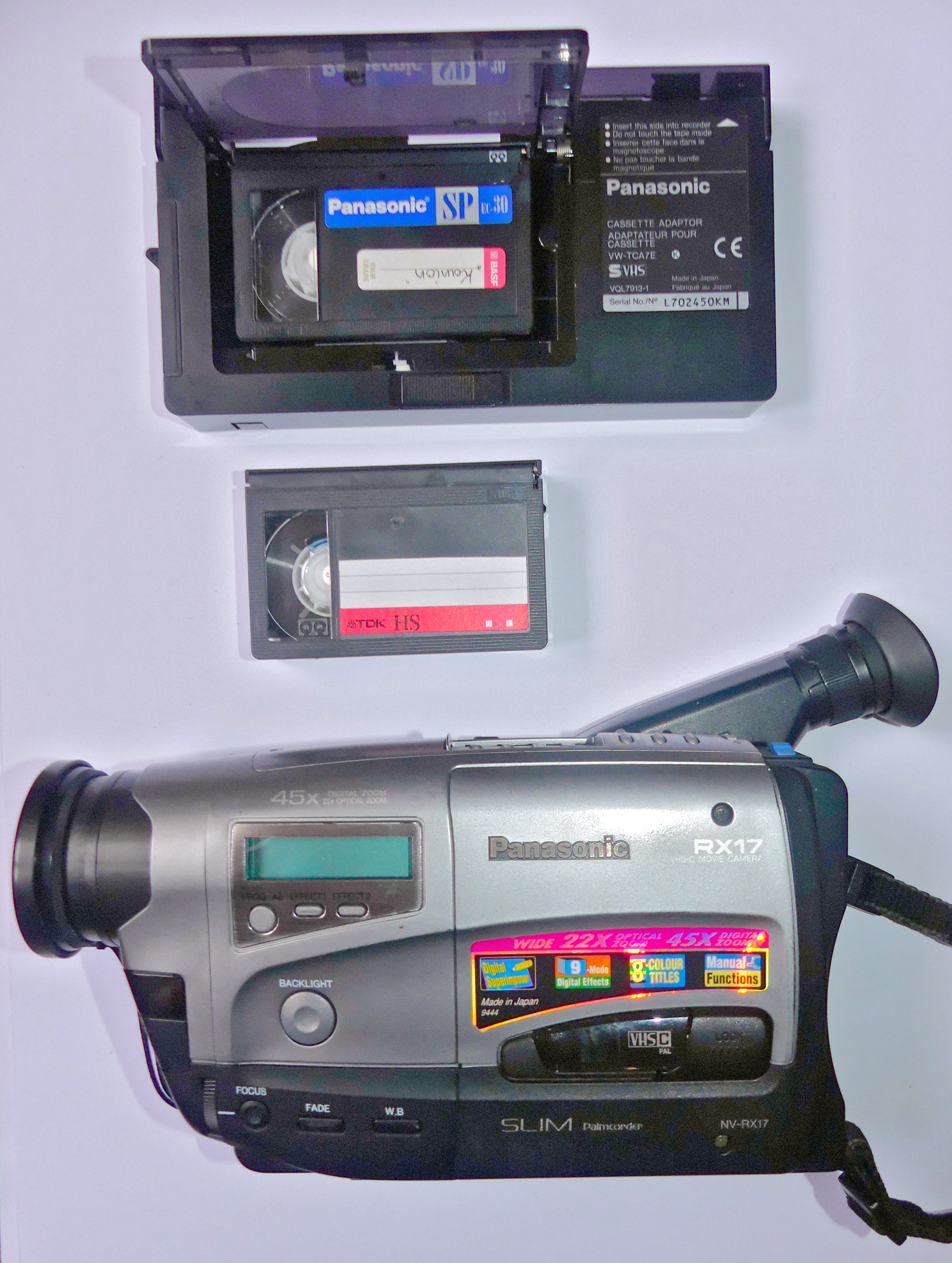
From top to bottom: VHS-C cassette adapter with door open and cassette inserted, VHS-C cassette, and camcorder

The magnetic tape on VHS-C cassettes is wound on one main spool and used a gear wheel which moves the tape forward. It can also be moved by hand. This development hampered the sales of the Betamax system somewhat, because the Betamax cassette geometry prevented a similar development.

=== Write Protect Imperfection ===
VHS-C cassettes have a switch to inhibit recording of a cassette. Not all adapters propagate the state of this switch to the VCR itself, so accidental erasure of a write-protected cassette is possible if the adapter's write protect lug or switch allows it.

=== VHS-C head drum ===
To reduce the size of cameras, the VHS-C mechanism uses a two-thirds size head drum (41.3 mm diameter instead of the original VHS drum size of 62 mm). The wrap angle is 270 degrees instead of VHS's 180 degrees. The drum rotates at a proportionately higher speed, and four rotary video heads are used to trace out exactly the same helical recording path as a standard sized VHS drum. By adding more heads, the same small VHS-C drum can record and playback FM Hi-Fi audio that is also fully compatible with a standard sized Hi-Fi video drum

== Adapter for VHS VCRs ==
VHS-C cassette was larger than Video8 cassette, but was compatible with VHS tape recorders, using a special adapter cassette. The adapter contains a standard full-size engagement hub for the VCR's takeup sprocket, which connected to a gear train to drive the VHS-C cassette takeup gear.

VHS end of tape is normally detected by a light in the VCR that inserts into the full-size cassette body, and detected by sensors in the VCR located at the far outer corners of the front of the cassette. Because the width of VHS-C is narrower than a full-size VHS cassette and does not align with the full-size end of tape sensors, the adapter has a guide roller swing arm to pull tape out of the VHS-C cartridge out to the far right edge where it would normally be located in a full-size cassette. When the VHS-C cartridge is to be removed from the adapter, a geared retraction system pulls in the excess loose tape when the swing arm retracts.

== Comparison to Video8 ==
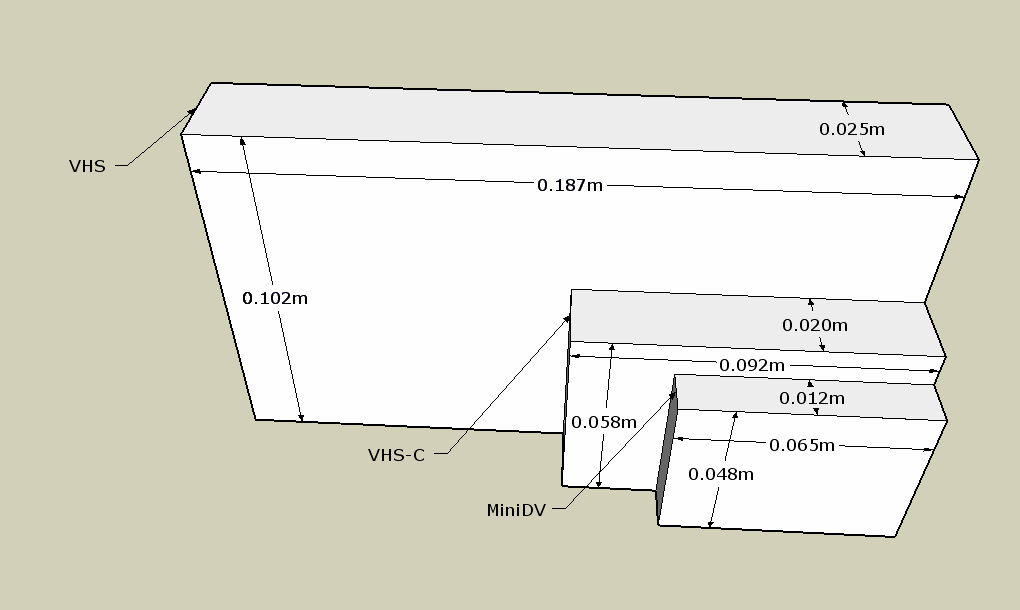
A size comparison between the original VHS format, VHS-C, and the more recent MiniDV

VHS-C had similar video quality as Video8, but a significantly shorter run time. During the 1980s, 20-minute VHS-C cassettes were the norm. In 1989 JVC increased the run time to 30 minutes by using thinner tape. Later, JVC offered 45-minute and 60-minute cassettes. For comparison, 120-minute 8-mm cassettes became available in late 1985 and quickly became the norm. Later, 150-minute and 180-minute 8-mm cassettes were offered as well.

The later Hi8 and S-VHS-C systems both have a quality similar to the LaserDisc system.

Although DV video was ported to 8-mm hardware in 1999 to become Digital8, D-VHS was never adapted to a compact VHS format. (Note: It is possible to record a D-VHS signal on an S-VHS-C cassette, with a cassette adapter. However no D-VHS VCRs were ever made that used the VHS-C loading mechanism.)

== S-VHS-C ==
S-VHS-C logo

A higher quality version of VHS-C was released, based on S-VHS, known as S-VHS-C, that competed against Hi8, the higher quality version of Video8. The arrival on the market of inexpensive S-VHS-C camcorders led to the inclusion on many modern VCRs of a feature known as SQPB, or SuperVHS Quasi-PlayBack, but did not make a significant impact on the market as the arrival of MiniDV as a consumer standard made low-cost, digital, near-broadcast quality video widely available to consumers, and rendered analog camcorders largely obsolete.

== Slackening problem ==
Early VHS-C cassettes did not have a mechanism to ratchet or lock the supply reel when not in use, making them susceptible to spilling tape inside the shell. Consequently, manufacturers placed a label on their camcorders and adapters to warn the user to check that the tape is not slackened before inserting a cassette. The user could remove the slack by manually turning the take-up gear. Later cassettes corrected this problem by adding teeth to the supply reel to lock it in place when no upward pressure is applied. The spindle of the camcorder or VCR supplies pressure to float the reel's turntable and teeth above the shell, allowing it to rotate freely when in use.

If a tape with slack was loaded into a VHS-C adapter, the tape could sit on the wrong side of a tape guide when the adapter loaded. The result would be a tape and cassette combination that would not play in a video deck, and would damage the tape to some extent when being unloaded.
