= MovieShaker =

Outdated video editing program made by Sony

MovieShaker is a legacy video editing program for Microsoft Windows made by Sony. The newest version of MovieShaker, released in 2002, is 3.3.3.

Compared to other video editing programs that are now available, MovieShaker is strictly low-tech. However, MovieShaker is required for capturing video from Sony MicroMV tapes in order to assure proper audio/video synchronization. In this case, the normal procedure would be to use MovieShaker for video capturing and then export the captured video as an MPEG file, which would then be suitable for further editing by other more sophisticated programs.

Sony states that MovieShaker requires a pre-installation of Apple QuickTime 5.0 or higher. However, an upgrade beyond Version 3.3 has yet to be released. Therefore, future compatibility with newer versions of QuickTime cannot be assured. In particular, it is possible that the MovieShaker user may begin to experience audio capture difficulty with an installation of QuickTime 7.0.

An alternative is to use MovieShaker to capture the video from Sony MicroMV tapes and save them to your hard disk as .MMV video files. These can then be converted by other utilities, such as MPEG Streamclip or mmv2mpg, a small utility to convert raw MMV files. Since MMV files use the MPEG-2 format, Apple's MPEG-2 Playback Component (commercial) or Quicktime Alternative] (freeware) must also be installed for MPEG-2 support.

Pinnacle Studio (versions 8 through 10) and Canopus ProCoder (rename the MMV extension to TS) can also open MMV files, and convert them into more convenient formats.

All Sony Vaio computers used to come pre-installed with this video editing software. This streamlines the editing process from a Sony Camera, because it uses a more direct firewire connection.
