= Ruvi =

Camera made by Sony

The Sony Ruvi is an analog video and still video camera released in 1998. The Ruvi was considerably smaller than any other camcorder available at the time, at 124 mm × 66 mm × 44.1 mm and 380 g. This made the Ruvi small enough to keep inside a shirt pocket. Ruvi is an abbreviation of Recording Unit by Video.

The small size was achieved by making the tape essentially non-removable. A miniature "video cartridge" contained thirty minutes of Hi8 tape permanently loaded around a conventional helical scan record head. The head itself was part of the cartridge, negating the need for a loading mechanism. Although user-replaceable, the cartridge was intended to be a service part and not a form of removable media.

The Ruvi contained several features that were considered innovative at the time of its release. The camera had high-density electronics packaging and a color-reflective LCD screen. The Ruvi also featured mechanical linkages for zoom optics. It could record up to 350 stills on the cartridge, each still being able to hold up to five seconds of audio, and a search function that would display them all in sequence. An "End Search" button automatically located the end of recorded material, readying the camera for new recordings.

Though it was considered an engineering marvel at the time of its release, the Ruvi achieved only mild success, mainly due to certain engineering trade offs to achieve a smaller size. As a result, only one model was ever produced, the CCD-CR1, before the system was discontinued in 1999. The Ruvi was briefly released in the United States and the United Kingdom.
