= Hall of Mirrors (film) =

2001 film by Brad Osborne

Hall of Mirrors is a 2001 independent film written and directed by Brad Osborne.

== Plot ==
Hall of Mirrors concerns a young, desperate gambling addict who is plummeted into financial ruin. A strange, anonymous caller (who happens to know every intimate detail of the protagonist's life) offers a unique solution to his situation. Lured by the promise of easy money and the beauty of an enigmatic woman, he enters an underworld of counterfeiters and con artists, where he becomes a pawn in a scheme far more elaborate and ruthless than he could have ever imagined.

== Historical importance of this film ==
With the making of Hall of Mirrors, Osborne successfully fooled experts into believing it had been shot on 16 mm film, when in fact it was shot on Sony Digital8 video cameras. This "film look" or filmizing was achieved using cinematic lighting techniques, a diffusion filter and a setting on the Sony Digital8 called "Flash", which is essentially a progressive frame mode. The "Flash" setting set on the fastest setting (about 30 frame/s) took away the "video" feel and added a subtle shutter effect.
