= HAD CCD =

Image sensor technology

HAD CCD is a Sony charge-coupled device (CCD) image sensor technology based on a hole accumulation diode (HAD), a sensor structure designed to suppress certain types of noise inherent to CCDs.

== List of HAD CCD sensors ==
Sony described HAD designs as offering low noise and strong low-light sensitivity. Related Sony branding included Super HAD implementations intended to improve low-light performance and reduce fixed-pattern noise in low-light shooting, as well as EXview HAD CCD variants for high-sensitivity shooting.

Model Number	Number of effective pixels	Sensor size (Diagonal)	Unit cell size	Sensitivity (typical value F5.6)	Sensor saturation signal (minimum value)	Output	Subpixel layout	Release date
ICX249	752 × 582 0.44 MP	8.0 mm 1/2"	8.6 μm × 8.3 μm	1100 mV	900 mV	Adjacent field line sums	Cy Ye G Mg	about 1999
ICX445	1296 × 966 1.25 MP	6.0 mm 1/3"	3.75 μm²	460 mV	350 mV		RGB	
ICX699	4640 × 3480 16.15 MP	7.757 mm 1/2.3"	1.34 μm²	626 digit	1757 digit		RGB	
ICX828	768 × 494 0.38 MP	8 mm 1/2"	8.4 μm × 9.8 μm	3200 mV (F5.6) 2800 mV (F8)	1400 mV		RGB	
ICX829	752 × 582 0.44 MP	8 mm 1/2"	8.6 μm × 8.3 μm	3200 mV (F5.6) 2800 mV (F8)	1400 mV		RGB	
ICX227AK	500 × 582 0.290 MP	4.5 mm 1/4"	7.3 μm × 4.7 μm	880 mV	810 mV		Cy Ye G Mg	about 2000

== See also ==
- Sony BIONZ
- Sony Exmor
- Nikon EXPEED
