= Hole accumulation diode =

Hole accumulation diode (HAD) is an electronic noise reduction device in a charge-coupled device (CCD) or CMOS imaging sensor, patented by the Sony Corporation. HAD devices function by reducing dark current that occur in the absence of light falling on the imager for noise reduction and enhanced image quality.

HAD, which is similar to the pinned photodiode, was developed by Yoshiaki Hagiwara's team at Sony between 1975 and 1980. HAD CCD sensors are used in consumer and professional single and three-chip video cameras.

== Operation ==
The "hole" refers to places in a semiconductor where an electron has been dislodged, thus creating a positive charge. These "holes" or positive charges can be created by heat or imperfections in the creation of the imaging chip. The "holes" are accumulated, or trapped, in a separate semiconductor layer that acts as a diode that prevents them from returning or creating noise. HAD technology suppresses the fixed pattern noise that results from "dark" current that occurs regardless of the amount of absorbed light. By fabricating a hole-accumulation layer below the surface of the CCD, "dark" current can be suppressed at the source.
