= MicroMV =

Proprietary videocassette format for camcorders

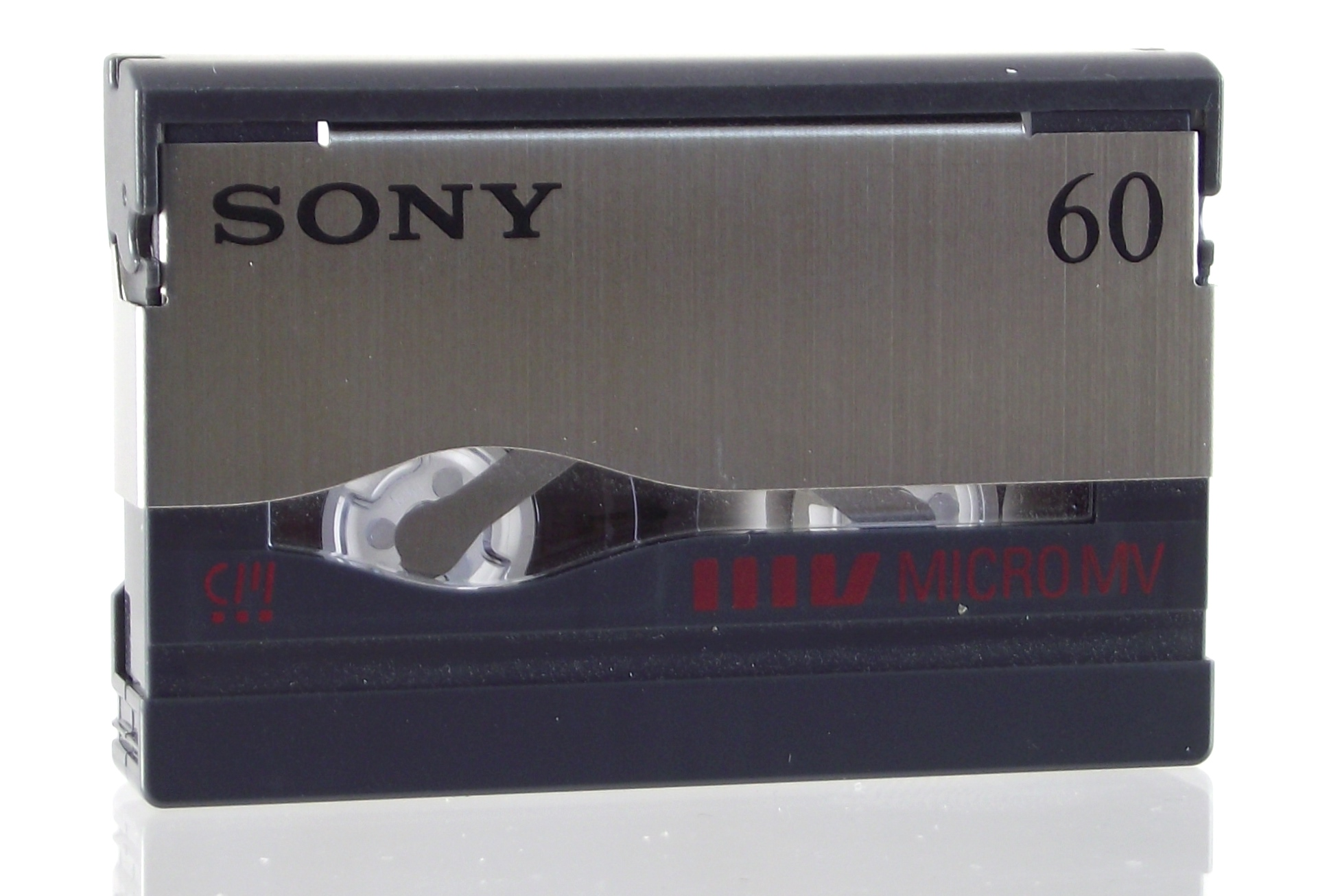
- MicroMV videocassette
- Media type: Magnetic cassette tape
- Encoding: NTSC, PAL
- Standard: Interlaced video
- Usage: Home movies
- Released: 2001; 24 years ago

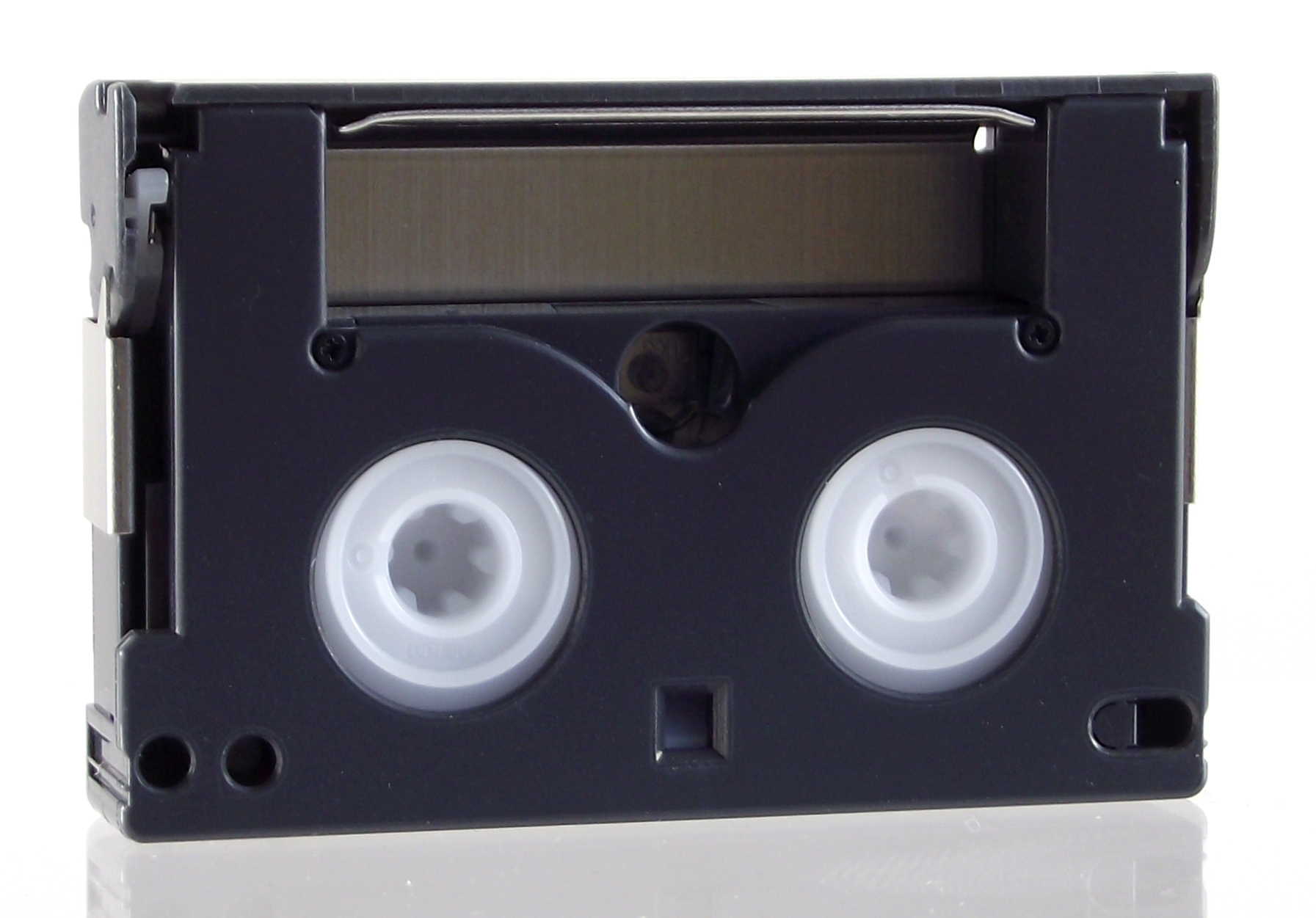
Rear side of MicroMV cassette

MicroMV is a digital video cassette format introduced in October 2001 by Sony. It is the smallest videotape format, 70% smaller than MiniDV or about the size of two US quarter coins; it is also smaller than a Digital8 or DV cassette and slightly smaller than an audio microcassette. It was the first helical scan tape system using MR read head introduced to the market. Each cassette can hold up to 60 minutes of video.

== Overview ==
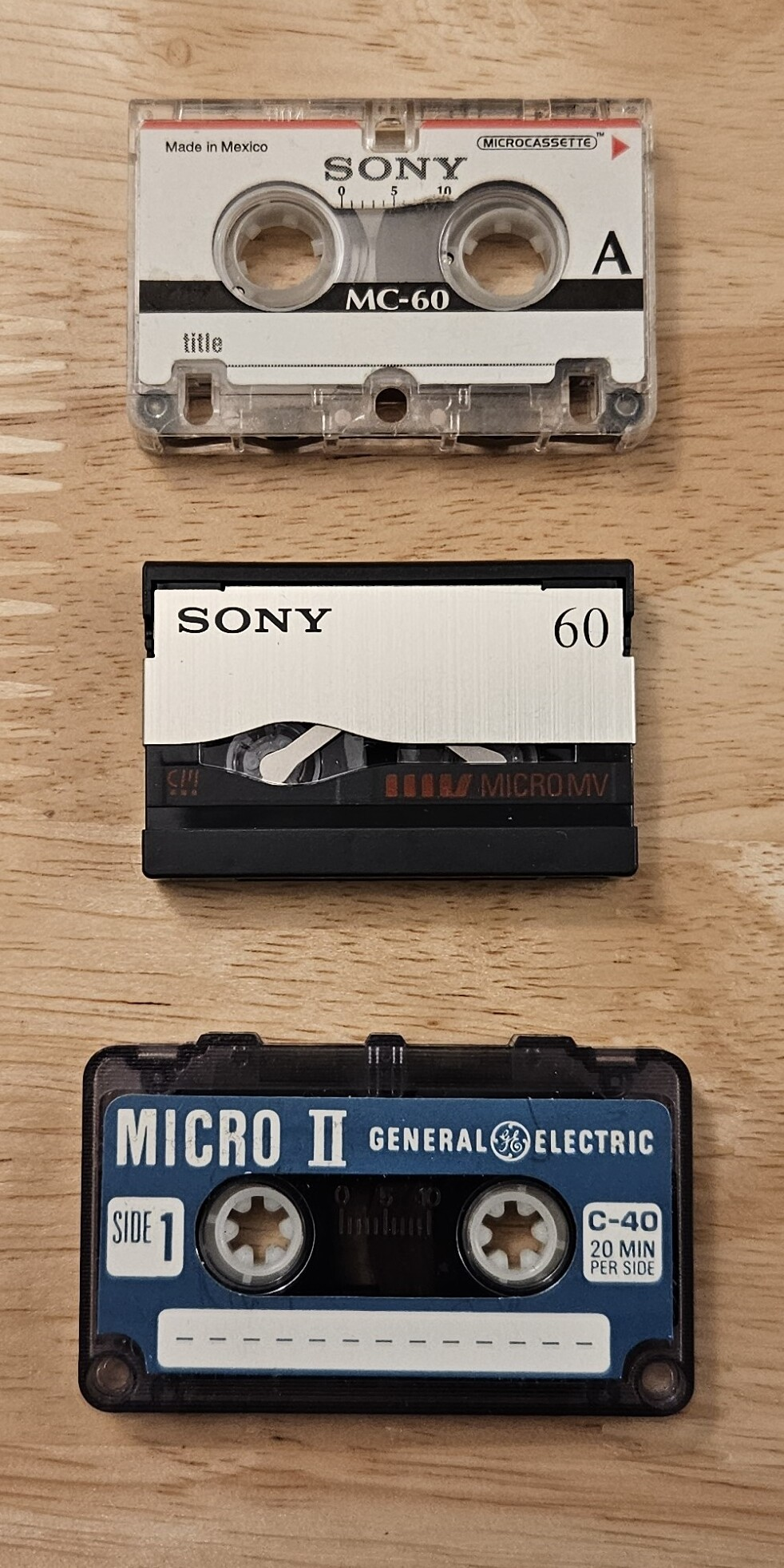
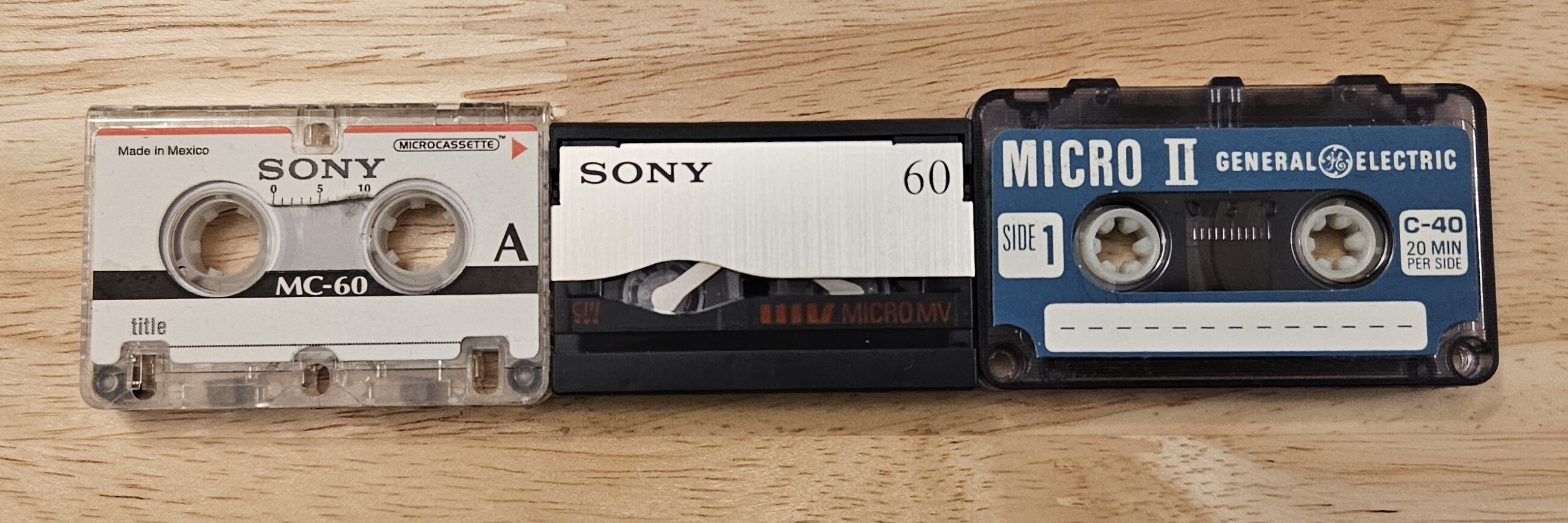
MicroMV compared to a Microcassette and Mini-Cassette

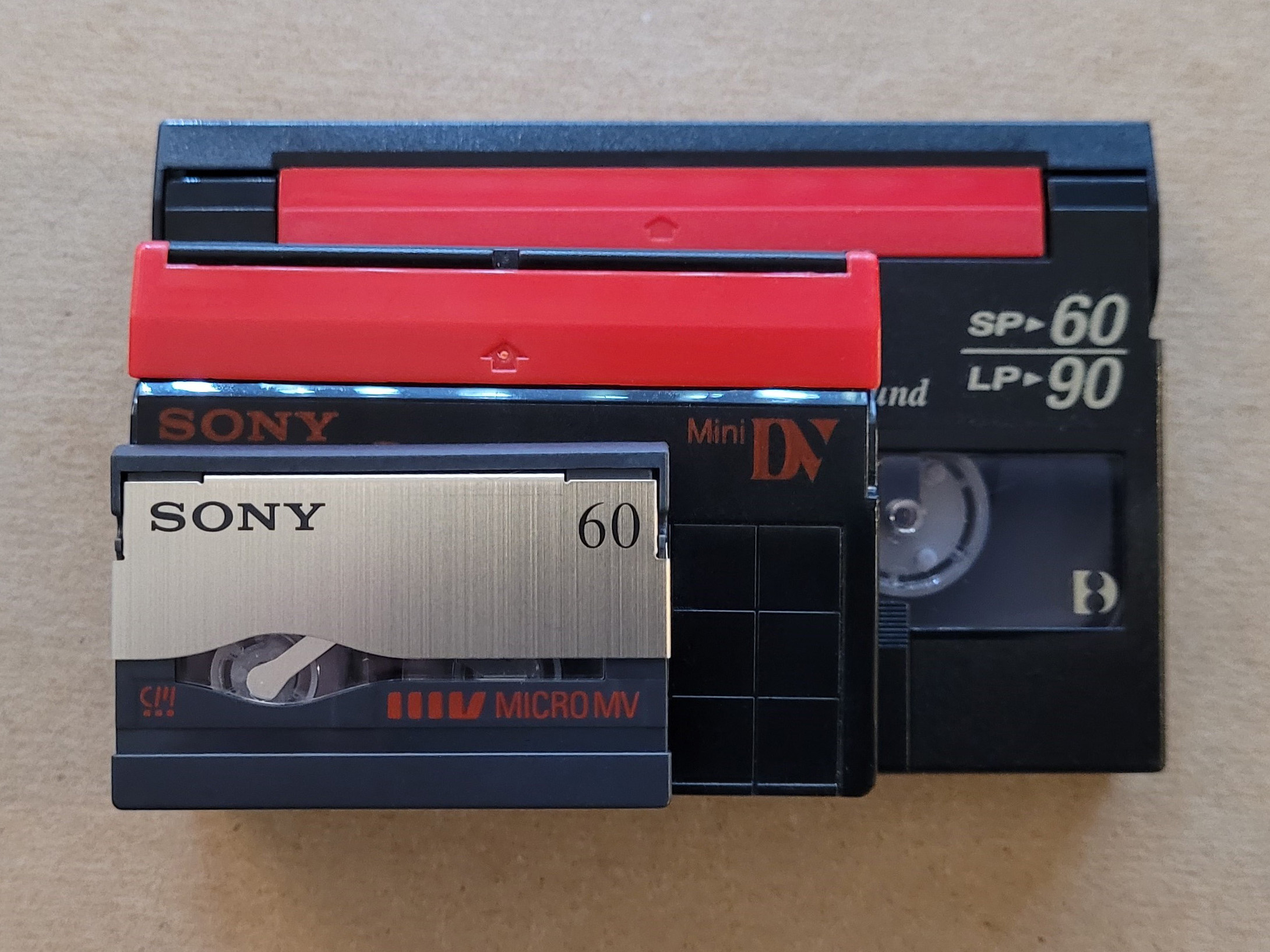
MicroMV compared to MiniDV and Digital8

The MicroMV format does not use the "DV25" codec used by the highly popular DV & MiniDV videocassette formats. Instead, it uses 12 Mbit/s MPEG-2 compression, like that used for DVDs and HDV. Footage recorded on MicroMV format initially could not be directly edited with mainstream DV editing software such as Adobe Premiere or Apple Final Cut Pro; instead Sony supplied its own video editing software MovieShaker (for Windows PCs only). Later versions of Ulead Video Studio and several freeware applications however could capture and edit from Sony MicroMV Camcorders.

MicroMV was unsuccessful. Sony was the only electronics manufacturer to sell MicroMV cameras. In 2006, Sony stopped offering new MicroMV camcorder models. In November 2015, Sony announced that shipment of MicroMV cassettes would be discontinued in March 2016.

== MicroMV camcorders ==
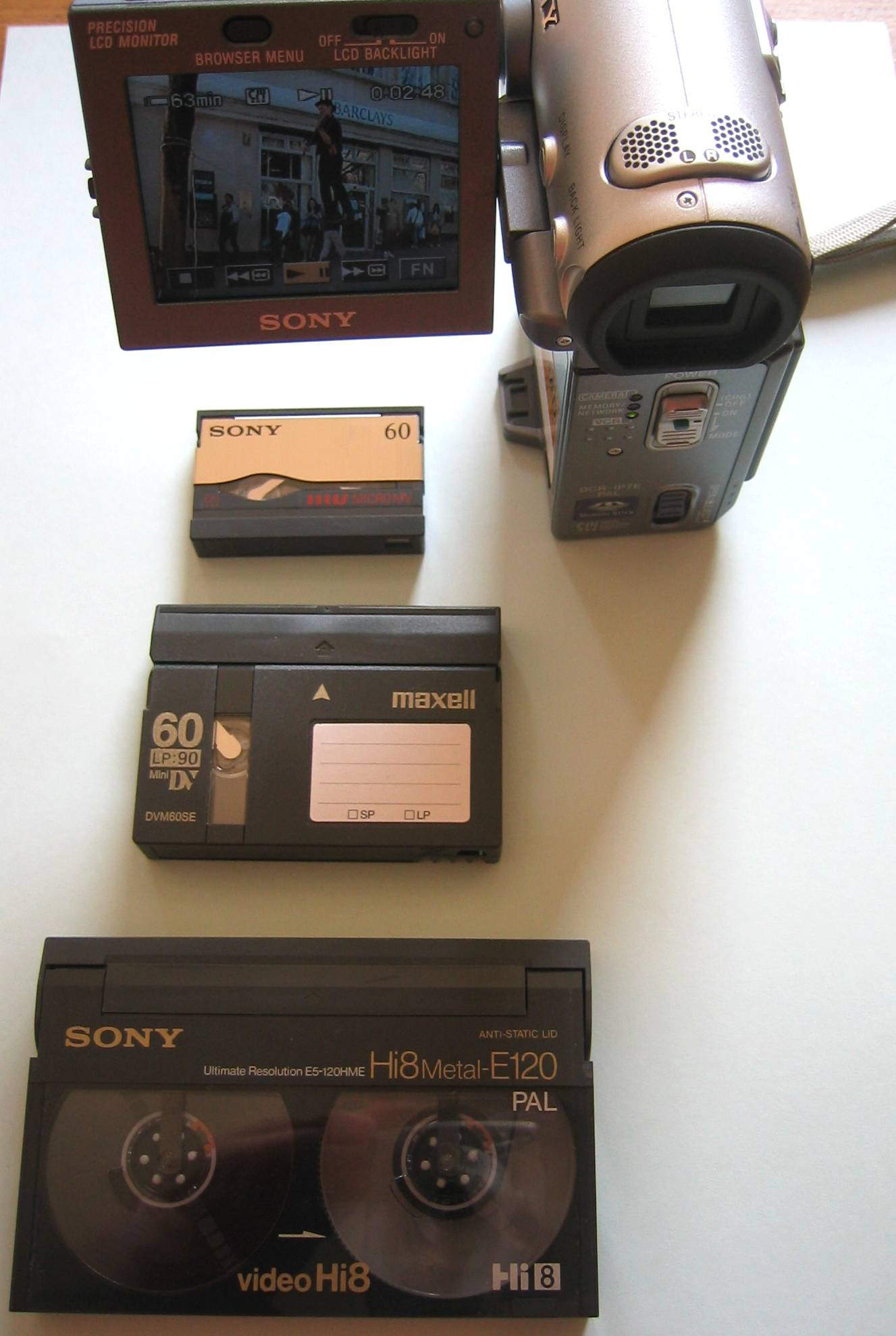
MicroMV camcorder and tape (top) compared to miniDV and Hi8 tapes

- Sony DCR-IP7 (2001)
- Sony DCR-IP5 (2001)
- Sony DCR-IP45 (2002)
- Sony DCR-IP55 (2002)
- Sony DCR-IP210 (2002)
- Sony DCR-IP220 (2002)
- Sony DCR-IP1 (2003)

PAL models end with an "E" (e.g. DCR-IP7E), while Japanese models end with a "K"

== Software supporting MicroMV ==
- MovieShaker—Sony's own video editing software originally supplied with MicroMV camcorders.
- Vegas Movie Studio-Supports capturing video from MicroMV camcorders (in HDV mode).
- CapDVHS-Supports capturing video from MicroMV camcorders.
- DVgate Plus—Software by Sony for capturing clips, including MicroMV.
- Pinnacle Studio versions 8 and 9—Captures clips and allows editing, DVD creation etc. Dropped from version 10.
- GrabMV—Captures MicroMV clips.
- FFmpeg—support for MPEG-TS playback
- Blender—Video Sequencer supports editing of the MPEG-TS directly thanks to ffmpeg.
- Apple iMovie '08 to '11 for Mac—Natively supports importing from MicroMV video cameras. Dropped from iMovie 10.x.
- Ulead DVD Workshop 2—Includes MPEG MicroMV video capture plugin.
- Ulead VideoStudio versions 7 to 9-Supports importing from MicroMV camcorders. Dropped from newer versions.
- Windows Movie Maker - included free with Windows Vista Home Premium

== See also ==
- Camcorder
