= Digital8 =

Magnetic tape-based consumer videocassette format for camcorders

- Media type: Magnetic cassette tape
- Encoding: NTSC, PAL
- Read mechanism: Helical scan
- Write mechanism: Helical scan
- Standard: Interlaced video
- Developed by: Sony
- Usage: Home movies
- Extended from: Hi8
- Released: 1999; 27 years ago

Digital8 (or D8) is a consumer digital recording videocassette for camcorders developed by Sony, and introduced in 1999.

The Digital8 format is a combination of the earlier analog Hi8 tape transport with the digital DV codec. Digital8 equipment uses the same videocassettes as analog recording Hi8 equipment, but the signal is encoded digitally using the industry-standard DV codec, which means it has identical digital audio and digital video specifications compared with DV.

To facilitate digital recording on existing Hi8 video cassettes the helical scan video head drum spins 2.5× faster. For both NTSC and PAL Digital8 equipment, a standard-length 120-minute NTSC/90-minute PAL Hi8 magnetic tape cassette will store 60 minutes of Digital8 video (Standard Play) or 90 minutes (Long Play). There are 90-minute versions marketed specifically for Digital8, but these use thinner tape than the 60-minute ones. LP is model specific, such as the TRV-30, TRV-40, and others. Digital8 recordings can be made on standard-grade Video8 cassettes, but this practice is discouraged in the Sony user manuals, and Hi8 metal-particle cassettes are the recommended type for Digital8 recording. Most Hi8 tapes sold after the introduction of D8 are marked for both Hi8 and Digital8 usage.

== Digital8 vs. DV ==
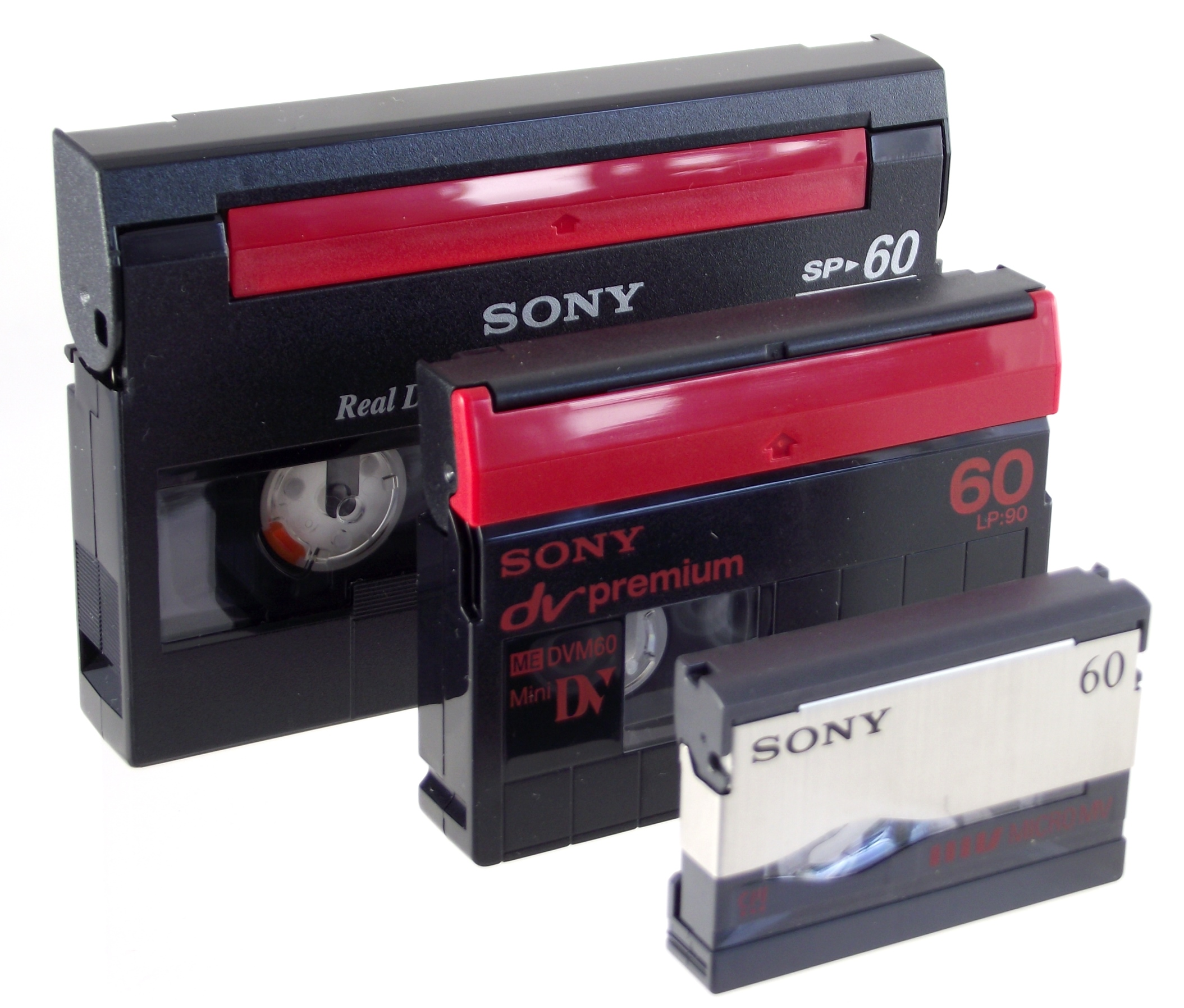
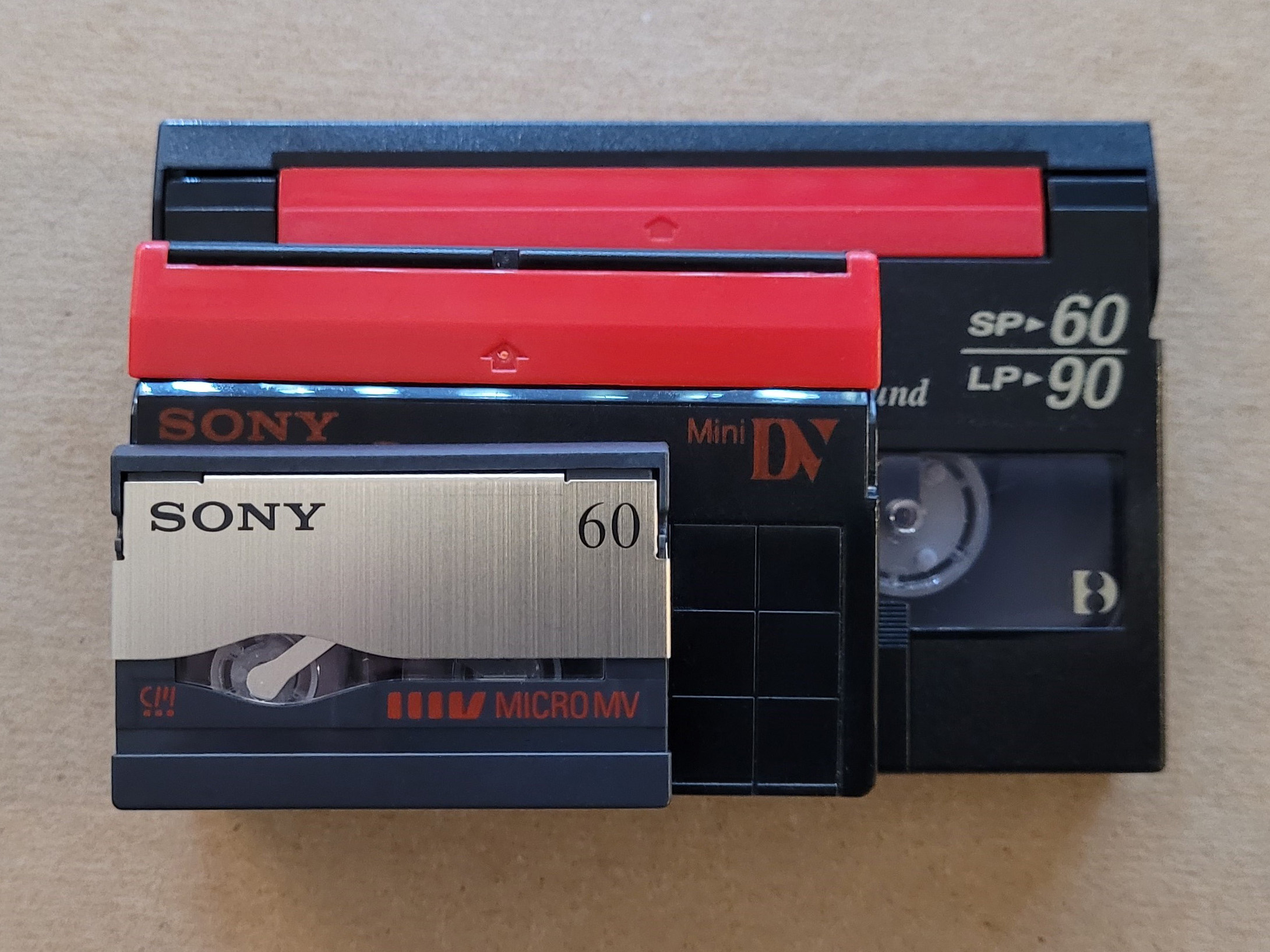
Digital8 (largest, at rear) compared to MiniDV (centre) and MicroMV (smallest, at front)

The Digital8 format is identical to baseline DV at the bitstream level. A Digital8 camcorder appears and behaves exactly like a DV camcorder when connected via a 1394/iLink/FireWire link.

Digital8 cassettes are identical to Video8/Hi8 cassettes and have dimensions of 95 mm × 62.5 mm × 15 mm. They are similar in size to medium-sized DV cassettes known as DVCPRO cassettes, which have dimensions 97.5 × 64.5 × 14.6 mm. Tape size is different too, 8 mm for Digital8 vs. 6.35 mm for DV. The cassettes are not interchangeable, and there is no adapter from one format to another.

Digital8 machines run tape at 29 mm per second, faster than baseline DV (19 mm/s) and comparable to professional DV formats like DVCAM (28 mm/s) and DVCPRO (34 mm/s). A 120-minute 8-mm cassette holds 106 m of tape and can store 60 minutes of digital video. A standard DVCPRO cassette holds 137 m of tape, good for 66 minutes of video.

== Market segment ==
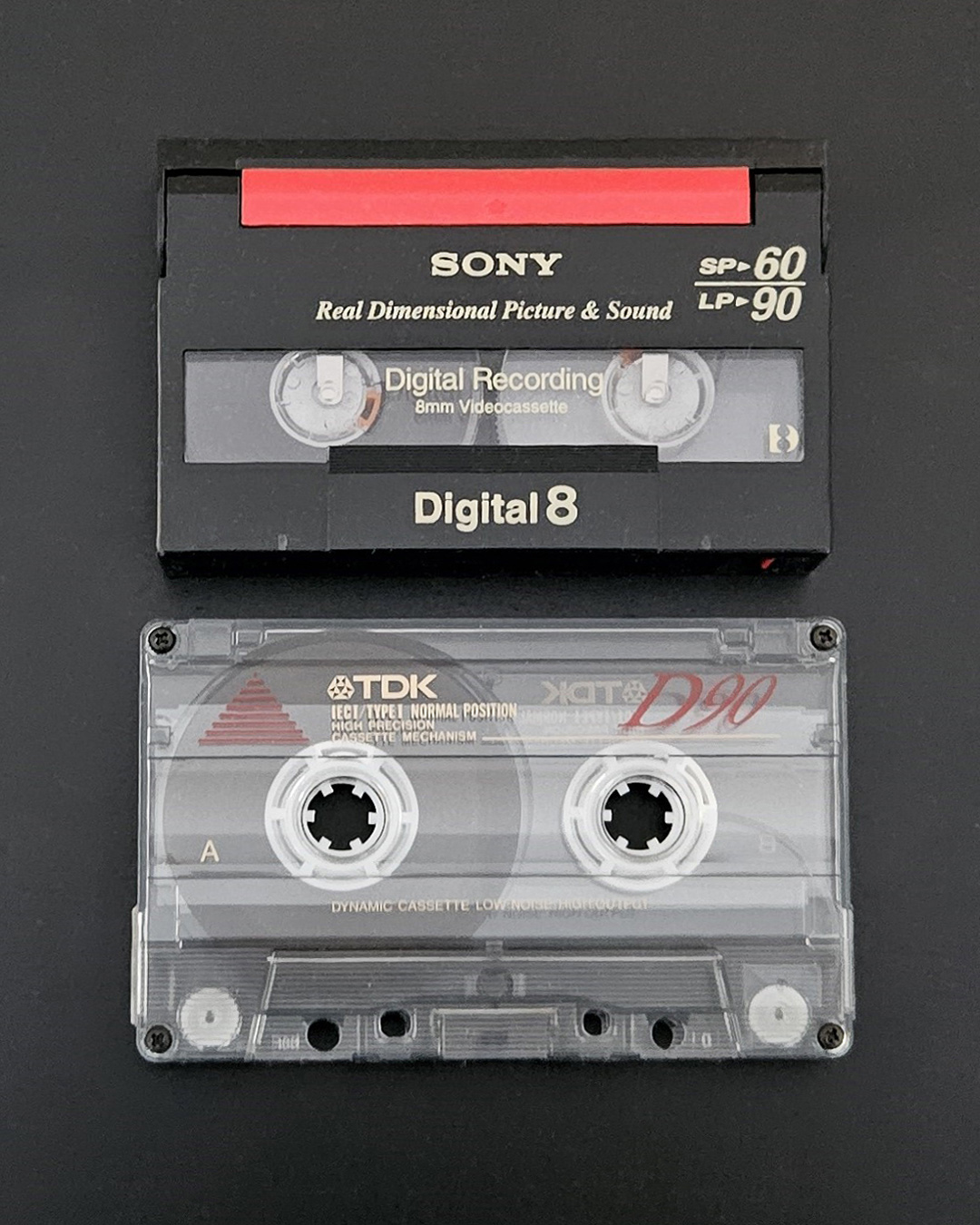
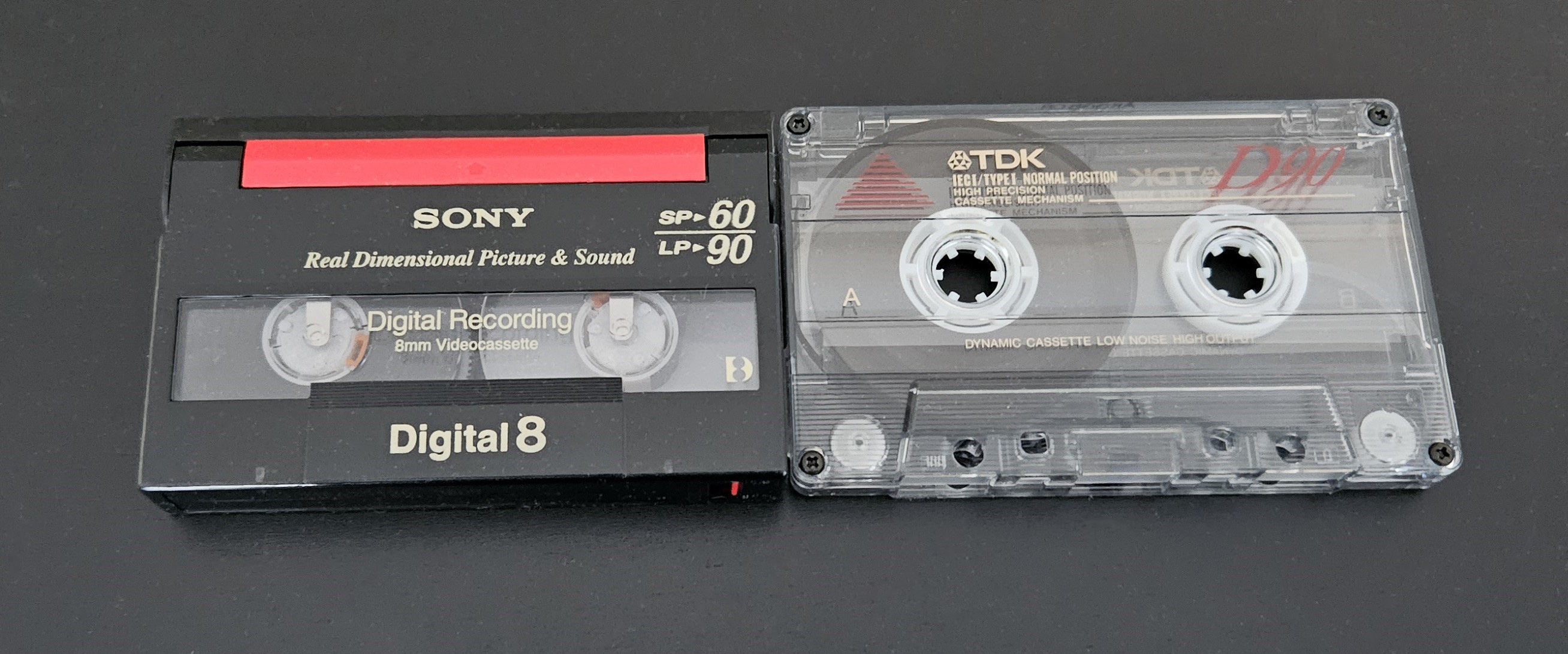
Digital8 cassette compared to Compact Cassette

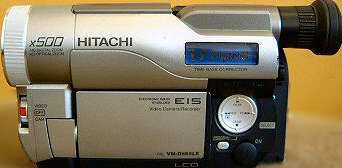
Hitachi VM-D965LE Digital8 Camcorder

Analog Hi8 video enjoyed widespread use in the amateur home video market, current affairs TV programs, and some professional news organizations. Digital8 remained largely a consumer or amateur product (Among the exceptions was the 2001 film Hall of Mirrors.) This is likely a reflection of Sony's design and market objectives for Digital8 format: to serve as a lower cost upgrade path for current customers (from analog 8 mm), by leveraging existing manufacturing infrastructure of 8 mm video equipment, and offering a familiar media format but with digital capabilities. Furthermore, Digital8 was released some time after MiniDV, giving the rival DV format a lead in the professional market.

Digital8 is an obsolete format. By 2004 Sony, the format's original backer, was the only company still producing Digital8 equipment, and had no plans to develop new Digital 8 cameras. Hitachi marketed a few Digital8 camcorders at the time as well. By 2005, the Digital8 product line catered purely to entry-level consumers. This is most likely because the larger, bulkier Digital8 cassette was perceived as an inferior technology, even though the Digital8 and DV formats offer indistinguishable A/V performance. The larger 8mm format is more robust, laying down wider tracks. Most, though not all, Digital8 camcorders can play back analogue Video8 and Hi8 tapes. As well as camcorders, Sony also released Digital8 Video Walkman portables, the GV-D200 and GV-D800.

== Camera model variations ==
In the early years after Digital8's introduction, Sony sold a product line with coverage from entry level to high-end consumer. The more consumer oriented line uses a 1/6" CCD image sensor and the more prosumer line uses a 1/4" one. Both existed from the beginning, but the 1/4" CCD models were discontinued.

1998-1999 models only support Digital8 recording and playback at SP speed. 2000 and newer models added LP speed Digital8 recording (only supported on Hi8 tapes, not Video8 tapes). All models with analog playback can play Video8/Hi8 recordings made at either SP or LP speed. 2000 and newer models with analog playback also support DV Passthrough mode for capturing an analog video source directly into a computer without needing to record it to Digital8 tape first.

Later Digital8 Handycams shared the same chassis, optics, and owner's manual with a range of analog Hi8 Handycams, although the CCD image sensor pixel count varied between the Digital8 (460K) and the Hi8 (320K) models.

Although the 1/4" CCD models are fully capable of taking a still photo, that is a secondary function and they lack the Sony Memory Stick feature to off-load the JPEG images. Most of the entry level and later models focused on features such as better quality still pictures (see below), off-loading the same via Sony Memory Sticks, and more programming selections. The combining of still image and video capture is now common, however a good still image CCD has different qualities from a good video CCD. The cameras also lost features generally appealing to a prosumer level customer. The 1999 TRV-310, for instance, has the 1/4" CCD, a 3.5" LCD screen, an f1.4 lens, variable shutter speed settings, manual focus, and other professional controls. The lens on a typical 1/6" CCD is f1.8, about 60% as fast as an f1.4. The TRV-310, has a 1/4" CCD with a pixel count of 460K and "effective count" of 290K. The larger CCD with fewer pixels allows a smaller depth of field for intentional blurred backgrounds in some situations unattainable with the 1/6" CCD. It also has greater light sensitivity, 1 lux vs. 7 lux for the 1/6" CCD (without Night Shot), and less sensor noise in low light conditions.

Another example of these capabilities changing with pixel count may be seen in the TRV-150, 250, 350, and 351 Digital8 models and their TRV-118, 318, and 418 Hi8 cousins. Despite having the same size CCD and the same f1.6 lens, the lower pixel count Hi8 models permit a 1 lux low light rating as compared to the 4 lux of the Digital8 models. The Sony DCR-TRV730/828/830 (and the later DCR-TRV740/840), were the only Digital8 camcorders to be built with a 1/4.7-inch (4.5 mm) with advanced HAD (Hole Accumulation Diode) CCD. HAD is useful on smaller, high-megapixel-count CCDs and CMOSs. The pixel count for the TRV-730 is 1,070,000 pixels (690,000 in camera mode.)

== Analog recordings ==
Higher-end Digital8 equipment may minimize analog generation loss by offering the ability to play back and digitize legacy analog 8 mm Video8/Hi8 format recordings, but none will record in analog. There are limitations, audio playback is limited to the Video8/Hi8 analog FM soundtrack, not any PCM digital audio track. Some models will play both NTSC and PAL recordings, others will only play their own native television standard. Analog recordings also lack timecode, so batch captures will not work. The digitized video signal can be transferred in the same way as native digital recordings, through the camcorder's FireWire cable port, thus simplifying video file creation on computers equipped with a FireWire port and video capturing software, or FireWire equipped DVD recorders. The advantage of creating digital files using the camera's digital stream conversion is that the resulting files on the computer can be burned to DVDs as well as facilitating computerized digital editing and storage as video files. Lossless digital editing can be achieved when utilizing the FireWire port between two similar Digital8 cameras. Digitizing legacy signals does not improve image quality, but the resulting files have highly accurate sampling of the source audio and video quality of the Video8/Hi8 original.

The models of Digital8 camcorders that are capable or not capable of playing back analog recordings are listed below.

Brand	Model	Year	Region	Analog playback	Passthrough
Sony	DCR-TRV103	1998	NTSC	Yes	No
Sony	DCR-TRV107	1998	Latin America	Yes	No
Sony	DCR-TRV110	1998	NTSC	Yes	No
Sony	DCR-TRV110E	1998	PAL	Yes	No
Sony	DCR-TRV120	2000	NTSC	Yes	Yes
Sony	DCR-TRV120E	2000	PAL	Yes	N/A
Sony	DCR-TRV130E	2001	PAL	No	No
Sony	DCR-TRV140	2002	NTSC	No	No
Sony	DCR-TRV145E	2003	PAL	No	No
Sony	DCR-TRV147E	2003	PAL	No	No
Sony	DCR-TRV150	2003	NTSC	No	No
Sony	DCR-TRV203	1999	NTSC Canada	Yes	No
Sony	DCR-TRV210	1999	NTSC	Yes	No
Sony	DCR-TRV220	2000	Asia Pacific	Yes	N/A
Sony	DCR-TRV230	2001	NTSC	Yes	Yes
Sony	DCR-TRV235E	2001	PAL	Yes	N/A
Sony	DCR-TRV238E	2002	PAL	Yes	N/A
Sony	DCR-TRV239E	2002	PAL	Yes	N/A
Sony	DCR-TRV240	2002	NTSC	Yes	Yes
Sony	DCR-TRV240E	2002	PAL	Yes	N/A
Sony	DCR-TRV245E	2003	PAL	No	No
Sony	DCR-TRV250	2003	NTSC	No	No
Sony	DCR-TRV255E	2004	PAL	No	No
Sony	DCR-TRV260	2004	NTSC	No	No
Sony	DCR-TRV265	2004	NTSC Export	No	No
Sony	DCR-TRV265E	2004	PAL	No	No
Sony	DCR-TRV270E	2005	PAL	No	No
Sony	DCR-TRV280	2005-2007	NTSC	No	No
Sony	DCR-TRV285E	2005-2007	PAL	No	No
Sony	DCR-TRV310	1999	NTSC	Yes	No
Sony	DCR-TRV315	1999	NTSC	Yes	No
Sony	DCR-TRV320	2000	NTSC	Yes	Yes
Sony	DCR-TRV325E	2001	PAL	Yes	N/A
Sony	DCR-TRV330	2001	NTSC	Yes	Yes
Sony	DCR-TRV330E	2001	PAL	Yes	Yes
Sony	DCR-TRV340	2002	NTSC	Yes	Yes
Sony	DVR-TRV340E	2002	PAL	Yes	Yes
Sony	DCR-TRV345E	2003	PAL	Yes	Yes
Sony	DCR-TRV350	2003	NTSC	Yes	Yes
Sony	DCR-TRV351	2003	NTSC Latin America	Yes	Yes
Sony	DCR-TRV355E	2003	PAL	Yes	Yes
Sony	DCR-TRV356E	2003	PAL Export/China	Yes	Yes
Sony	DCR-TRV360	2004	NTSC	No	No
Sony	DCR-TRV361	2004	NTSC Export	No	No
Sony	DCR-TRV380	2005	NTSC Export	No	No
Sony	DCR-TRV410E	1999	PAL	Yes	N/A
Sony	DCR-TRV420E	2000	PAL	Yes	N/A
Sony	DCR-TRV430E	2001	PAL	Yes	N/A
Sony	DCR-TRV460	2004	NTSC	Yes	Yes
Sony	DCR-TRV460E	2004	PAL	Yes	N/A
Sony	DCR-TRV461E	2004	PAL Export	Yes	N/A
Sony	DCR-TRV480	2005	NTSC	Yes	Yes
Sony	DCR-TRV480E	2005	PAL	Yes	N/A
Sony	DCR-TRV510	1999	NTSC	Yes	No
Sony	DCR-TRV520	2000	NTSC	Yes	Yes
Sony	DCR-TRV525	2000	NTSC	Yes	Yes
Sony	DCR-TRV530	2001	NTSC	Yes	Yes
Sony	DCR-TRV530E	2001	PAL	Yes	N/A
Sony	DCR-TRV620E	2000	PAL	Yes	N/A
Sony	DCR-TRV720	2000	NTSC	Yes	Yes
Sony	DCR-TRV730	2001	NTSC	Yes	Yes
Sony	DCR-TRV730E	2001	PAL	Yes	N/A
Sony	DCR-TRV738E	2002	PAL	Yes	N/A
Sony	DCR-TRV740	2002	NTSC	Yes	Yes
Sony	DCR-TRV820	2000	NTSC	Yes	Yes
Sony	DCR-TRV828	2001	NTSC Latin America	Yes	Yes
Sony	DCR-TRV830	2001	NTSC	Yes	Yes
Sony	DCR-TRV840	2002	NTSC	Yes	Yes
Sony	DCR-TR7000	1999	NTSC	Yes	No
Sony	DCR-TR7000E	1999	PAL	Yes	No
Sony	DCR-TR7100	1999	PAL	Yes	No
Sony	DCR-TR8000E	1999	PAL	Yes	No
Hitachi	All models	-	-	Yes	No

== See also ==
- Video8
- Hi8
- Data 8
