= Hi8 =

8 mm video cassette tape

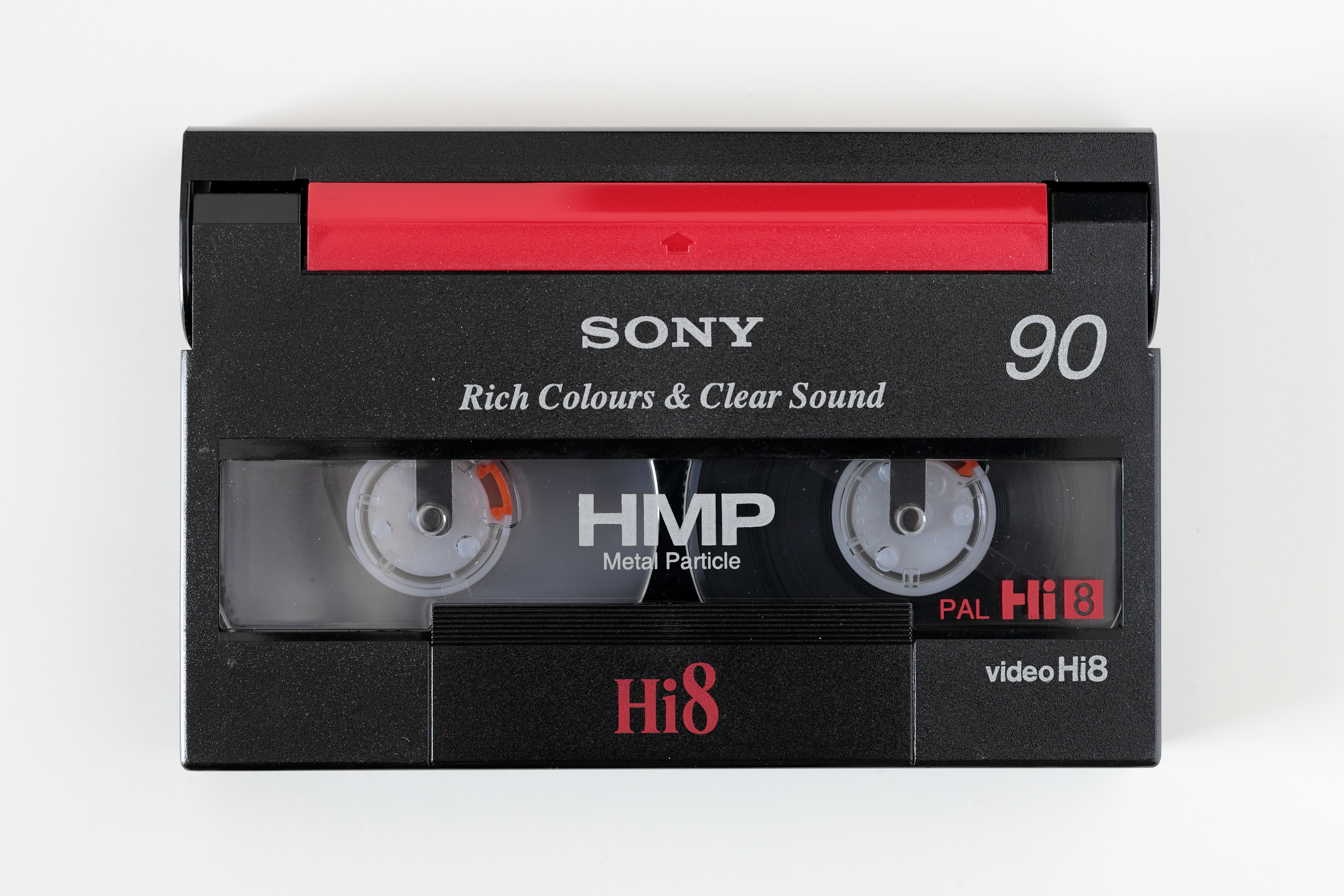
- Media type: Magnetic cassette tape
- Encoding: NTSC, PAL
- Read mechanism: Helical scan
- Write mechanism: Helical scan
- Standard: Interlaced video
- Developed by: Sony
- Usage: Home movies
- Extended from: Video8
- Extended to: Digital8
- Released: 1989

Hi8 (high-band Video8) is a consumer analog recording videocassette for camcorders based on the 8 mm video format developed by Sony, and introduced in 1989. The name is an improvement on the original Video8 format and mainly competed with Super-VHS.

== Overview ==
Hi8 uses improved recorder electronics and media formulation to increase the recorded bandwidth of the luminance signal. The FM carrier frequency range was increased from 4.2 to 5.4 MHz for regular Video8 (1.2 MHz bandwidth) to 5.7 to 7.7 MHz for Hi8 (2.0 MHz bandwidth). However, chroma signal bandwidth (color resolution) was not increased.

Both Hi8 and S-VHS were officially rated at a luminance resolution of 400 lines, a vast improvement from their respective base formats and are roughly equal to Laserdisc quality. Chroma resolution for both remain unchanged.

Both S-VHS and Hi8 retain the audio recording systems of their base formats; VHS HiFi Stereo outperforms Video8/Hi8 AFM, but remains restricted to high-end machines, and was not usable on camcorders. In the late 1980s, digital (PCM) audio was introduced into some higher-grade models of Hi8 recorders. Hi8 PCM audio operates at a sampling rate of 32 kHz with 16-bit samples—higher fidelity than the monaural linear dubbing offered by VHS/S-VHS. PCM-capable Hi8 recorders can simultaneously record PCM stereo in addition to the legacy (analog AFM) stereo audio tracks.

The final upgrade to the Video8 format came in 1998, when Sony introduced XR capability (extended resolution). Video8-XR and Hi8-XR offers a modest 10% improvement in luminance detail. XR equipment replays non-XR recordings well, and XR recordings are fully playable on non-XR equipment, though without the benefits of XR.

All Hi8 equipment can record and play in the legacy Video8 format. The reverse is not usually the case though there are a few late-entry Video8 systems that recognize and play Hi8 recordings.

== See also ==
- Video8
- Digital8
- Data 8
- Digital Tape Recording System
