= Icon Ventures =

- Type: Private
- Industry: Venture capital
- Founded: 2003
- Founder: Joe Horowitz
- Headquarters: 505 Hamilton Ave; Palo Alto, California, USA
- Area served: United States
- Key people: Joe Horowitz; Tom Mawhinney; Jeb Miller; Preeti Rathi
- Services: Financing
- Parent: JAFCO
- Website: www.iconventures.com

Icon Ventures is an American venture capital firm located in Palo Alto, California, United States.

== History ==
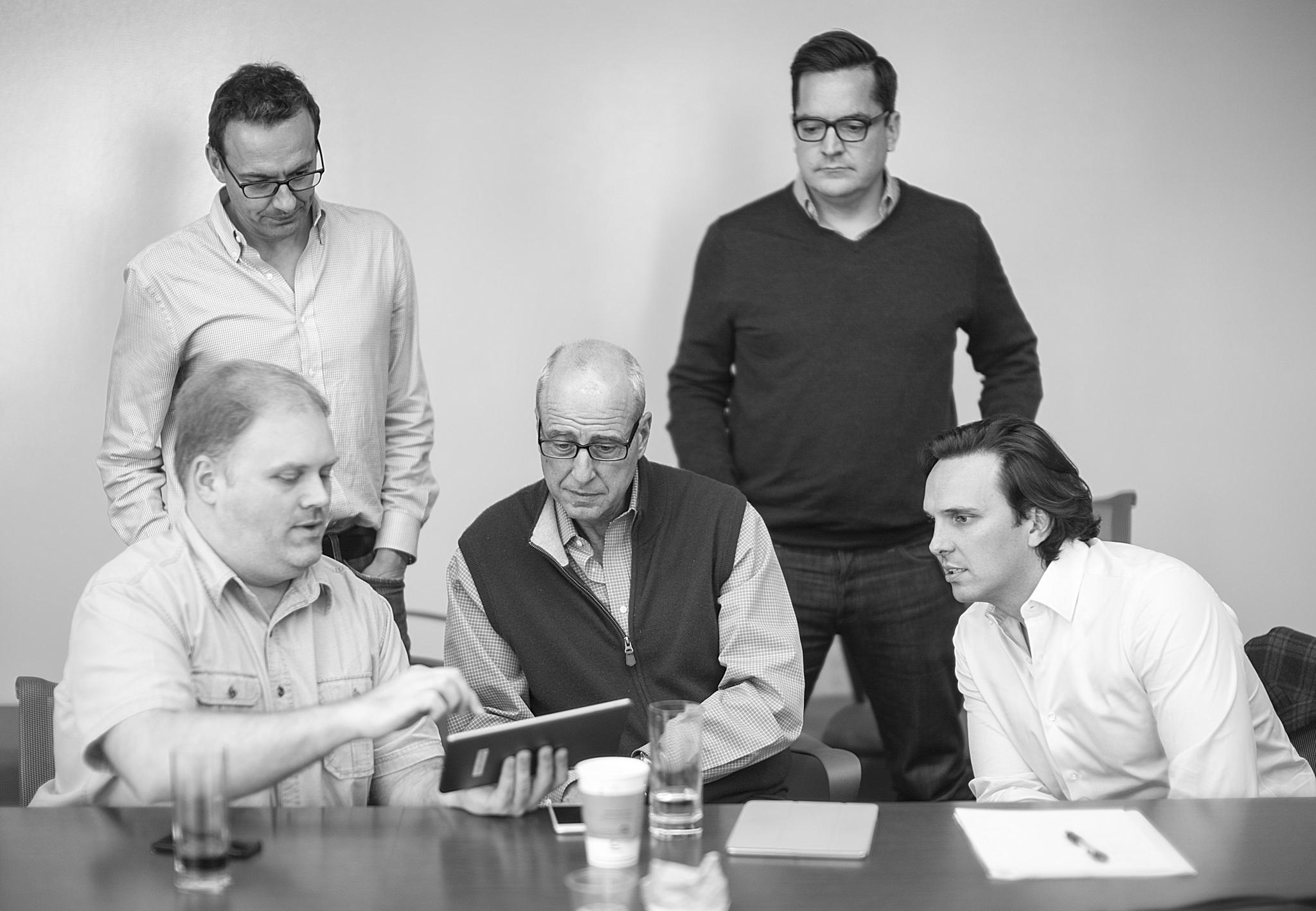
Jafco 2014. Front row: David Scott, Joe Horowitz, Will Harbin

Icon Ventures was founded by Joe Horowitz in 2003 in Palo Alto, California under the name Jafco Ventures. The company rebranded as Icon Ventures in January 2015. Until 2014, its capital was exclusively provided by JAFCO, a Japanese investment fund.

In October 2017, Icon Ventures raised its sixth fund of $265M from a diversified group of investors.

In October 2018, the firm announced an expansion of that fund to $375M.

== Business description ==
Icon Ventures has historically funded early stage, and growth stage investments in private technology-based businesses. Significant technology companies that it has backed include Bill.com, Teladoc, FireEye, Palo Alto Networks, and Proofpoint.

Icon Ventures Fund I is currently listed as the 6th best performing fund of recent times in the sub-$250M category by Pitchbook.

As of August 2021, its most recent lead investments were At Bay, Nomad Health, Timescale and Quizlet.

== See also ==
- Venture Capital
