= JAFCO =

Japanese venture capital firm

JAFCO Group Co., Ltd

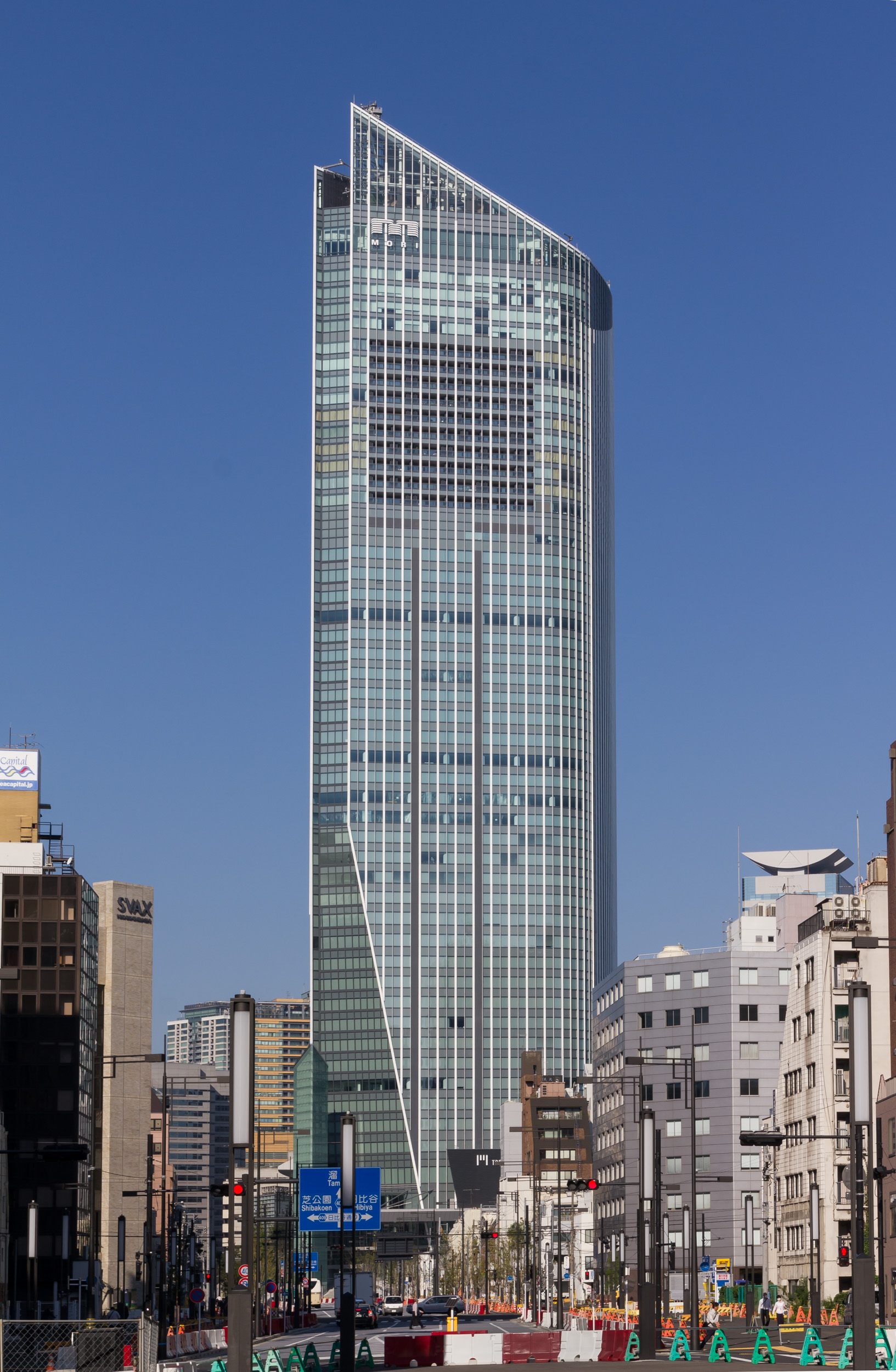
- Headquarters at Toranomon Hills, Minato-ku, Tokyo
- Native name: ジャフコ グループ株式会社
- Type: Public (Kabushiki gaisha)
- Traded as: TYO: 8595
- Industry: Investment management
- Founded: 1973; 53 years ago
- Headquarters: Toranomon Hills, Toranomon, Minato-ku, Tokyo, Japan
- Key people: Shinichi Fuki (President & CEO)
- Products: Private Equity; Venture Capital
- Revenue: ▲¥27.68 billion (31 March 2022)
- Operating income: ▲¥16.88 billion (31 March 2022)
- Net income: ▼¥15.08 billion (31 March 2022)
- Total assets: ▼¥233.02 billion (31 March 2022)
- Total equity: ▼¥197.39 billion (31 March 2022)
- Number of employees: ▲135 (31 March 2022)
- Subsidiaries: JAFCO Asia; Icon Ventures
- Website: jafco.co.jp

JAFCO Group Co., Ltd. (ジャフコ グループ株式会社) is an investment holding company headquartered in the Toranomon district of Minato-ku, Tokyo, Japan. It is listed on the First Section of the Tokyo Stock Exchange. JAFCO is considered to be the oldest as well as largest venture capital company in Japan.

== History ==
In April 1973, JAFCO was established in Chūō, Tokyo under the name Japan Associated Finance Co. Ltd, with a capital of ¥500 million. It was created by multiple Japanese financial institutions including Nomura Securities, Nippon Life Insurance and Sanwa Bank. Nomura was the largest shareholder.

In April 1982, JAFCO established Japan's first venture capital partnership fund.

In April 1984, JAFCO America Ventures Inc. was established in San Francisco.

In February 1996, JAFCO moved its head office to Chiyoda, Tokyo.

In August 1997, the company was renamed to JAFCO Co., Ltd.

In May 1998, JAFCO established its buyout investment unit.

In January 2001, JAFCO held an initial public offering to list its shares on the First Section of the Tokyo Stock Exchange.

In 2003, JAFCO America Ventures Inc., was spun off to become Globespan Capital Partners, as part of a management buyout. In the same year a second American subsidiary was established called Jafco Ventures (now renamed to Icon Ventures).

In July 2017, Nomura sold all its shares of its stake in JAFCO.

In October 2020, the company was renamed to JAFCO Group Co. Ltd.

== Business overview ==
JAFCO raises capital from investors and allocates it to its funds. The funds make equity investments in selected startups and unlisted companies to provide growth capital. JAFCO also provides management services, loans and consultation services to the invested companies. The objective is to increase enterprise value of its portfolio companies and to lead them to exits through various means such as IPO, M&A. JAFCO will receive capital gains as a result of the successful exits.

As of 31 March 2020, the majority of JAFCO's investments are venture capital investments made in Japan (55.2%). Other investments include buyout investments in Japan (16.4%) and venture capital investments made in US (24.2%) and Asia ex-Japan (4.2%).

JAFCO is headquartered in the Toranomon district of Minato-ku, Tokyo, Japan with other regional branches in Chubu, Kansai and Kyushu.

Notable investments include Shintom, Nippon Cable, Cyberdyne and UUUM.

== Alleged Misconduct ==
=== Sexual Assault Incident ===
In October 2024, multiple male employees of JAFCO Group were reported to have sexually assaulted a female contract worker. According to the woman’s account, she faced persistent harassment from shortly after joining the company in 2018, including late-night phone calls and pressure to attend drinking sessions. In December 2019, following a year-end party, she alleges that one of the employees strangled her with a scarf and touched her chest. Disciplinary actions were taken against the perpetrators; however, the woman was subsequently encouraged to resign and forced to renew her contract at half her previous salary. She was ultimately laid off in 2022.

While the victim is pursuing legal action, JAFCO Group denies any link between her dismissal and her sexual harassment complaints. Reporting on the incident has drawn parallels to broader concerns in Japan, where 52.4% of female entrepreneurs have reported experiencing some form of harassment within the past year. The case has also brought attention to how sexual harassment issues are addressed industry-wide, including by the Japan Venture Capital Association.

On November 20, 2024, the victim’s legal representative sent letters to seven companies that co-invest with JAFCO, asking them to urge JAFCO—from their position as investors—to provide a formal apology, compensation, and to improve the workplace environment. Of those seven companies, four (Chugoku Electric Power, Intec, Azbil, and Chudenko) formally requested that JAFCO “respect human rights” and “implement preventive measures against harassment, including secondary harassment.”

== Subsidiaries ==
=== JAFCO Asia ===
JAFCO Asia is a wholly owned subsidiary of JAFCO that operates in Asia (excluding Japan) with a focus on technology companies.

In 1990, JAFCO and Nomura established a joint-venture subsidiary in Singapore named Nomura/JAFCO Investment (Asia) Ltd. In 1999, JAFCO acquired full control of the subsidiary where it was renamed to JAFCO Investment (Asia Pacific).

It is headquartered in Singapore with additional offices in Beijing, Shanghai and Taipei. JAFCO Asia also had an office in South Korea which spun off to become BridgePole Investment Co. Ltd. as part of a management buyout in 2019.

Notable investments include Tudou, Teabox, Bubbly, ChinaCache, Mistral Solutions, CustomerXPs and HiSoft.

=== Icon Ventures ===
Icon Ventures is a wholly owned subsidiary of JAFCO that operates in the United States.

in 2003, Jafco Ventures was founded by Joe Horowitz in 2003 in Palo Alto, California. JAFCO would provide capital for its funds. In 2015, Jafco Ventures was rebranded as Icon Ventures to strengthen its brand name in the US.

Icon Ventures has historically funded early stage, and growth stage investments in private technology-based businesses. Significant technology companies that it has backed include Bill.com, Teladoc, FireEye, Palo Alto Networks, and Proofpoint.
