= Clari5 =

Software company

Clari5 (CustomerXPs)
- Industry: Software; Fintech
- Founded: 2006
- Headquarters: Bengaluru, Karnataka, India
- Key people: Rivi Varghese (Co-founder, CEO); Aditya Lal (Co-founder, CTO); Balaji Suryanarayana (Co-founder, COO)
- Number of employees: 200 (2025)
- Website: www.clari5.com

CustomerXPs Software Private Limited, doing business as Clari5, is an Indian financial technology company based in Bengaluru, India. The company develops software for enterprise fraud management, anti-money laundering (AML), transaction monitoring and financial crime risk management for banks and other financial institutions. The company was founded in 2006, and acquired by Perfios in February 2025.

== History ==
Clari5 (CustomerXPs) was founded in 2006 by Rivi Varghese, Aditya Lal, Balaji Suryanarayana, and Sandhya V. In 2008, the company received early investment (approximately $1 million) from former Infosys executive Sharad Hegde. In January 2011, CustomerXPs raised $4 million in Series A funding from JAFCO Asia. CustomerXPs also received support from Microsoft Accelerator.

The company introduced the Clari5 product brand in 2012. In 2014, it released Clari5 Sherlock as a fraud detection system using big data analytics. It expanded its portfolio for fraud detection and financial crime management, and during the following decade was reported on in independent industry publications for its deployments in banking and its focus on real-time fraud detection and AML technologies.

In January 2025, Punjab National Bank became the first bank to implement I4C's National Cybercrime Reporting Portal (NCRP) using Clari5's real-time NCRP integration platform.

In February 2025, B2B SaaS company Perfios acquired Clari5. After the acquisition, Clari5 became a wholly owned subsidiary while maintaining independent operations. In May 2025, Mashreq Bank announced a partnership with Clari5 for a generative AI-powered fraud detection, prevention, and investigation platform called Clari5 Genie.

== Product ==
Clari5 develops enterprise software used by financial institutions for fraud detection, anti–money laundering (AML), transaction monitoring, real-time, cross-channel monitoring, customer onboarding risk assessment. and financial crime risk management. Its software is designed to support real-time monitoring of payment channels, customer risk analysis and case investigation workflows. In 2025, the company introduced Clari5 Genie, a generative AI-based investigation assistant intended to support fraud analysts during alert review and case investigation.

== Recognition ==
- Recognized Best in Class at IBS Intelligence Middle East Banking Excellence (IBSi MEBX 2026) Awards
- Recognized in Chartis FCC50 2026 and Wins Category Award for Cognitive AI
- Received industry awards for financial crime technology implementations at the Bharat Fintech Summit 2026
- Wins Best RegTech at Banking Tech Awards 2025
