= VCR/DVD combo =

Converged electronic device

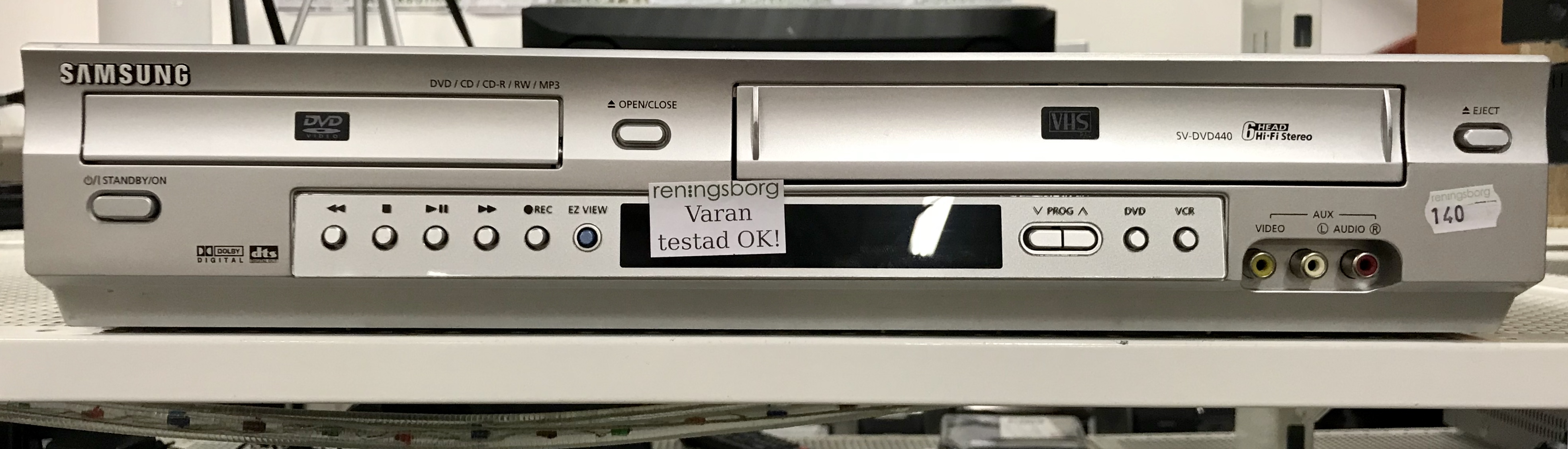
Samsung SV-DVD440, a combo DVD player and VCR unit introduced to consumers in 2004.

A VCR/DVD combination, VCR/DVD combo, or DVD/VCR combo, is a multiplex or converged device that allows the ability to watch both VHS tapes and DVDs. Many such players can also play additional formats such as CD and VCD.

VCR/DVD player combinations were first introduced around the year 1999, with the first model released by Go Video, model DVR5000, manufactured by Samsung Electronics. VCR/DVD combinations were sometimes criticized as being of poorer quality in terms of resolution than stand-alone units. These products also had a disadvantage in that if one function (DVD or VHS) became unusable, the entire unit needed to be replaced or repaired, though later models which suffered from DVD playback lag still functioned with the VCR.

Normally in a combo unit, it will have typical features such as recording a DVD onto VHS (on most), record a show to VHS with a digital-to-analog converter device (unless a unit has a digital TV tuner), LP recording for VHS, surround sound for Dolby Digital and DTS (DVD), component connections for DVD (although some may lack the connection), 480p progressive scan for the DVD side, VCR+, playback of tapes in a variety of playback speeds, and front A/V inputs (VCR only).

To help the consumer, they will have one or more buttons for switching the output source for ease of use. Usually, the recording capabilities are VCR exclusive, while the better picture quality is DVD exclusive, but some models include S-Video, Component, or HDMI output for VCR as well. These devices were among the only VCRs alongside some VCR/Blu-ray combos to be equipped with an HDMI port for HDTV viewing upscaling to several different types of resolutions including 1080i.

Shortly after the turn of the century, combo devices including DVD recorders (instead of players) also became available. These could be used for transferring VHS material onto recordable blank DVDs. In rare cases, such devices had component inputs to record with the best connection possible.

In July 2016, Funai Electric Co., the last remaining manufacturer of VCR/DVD combos, announced they would cease production at the end of the month due to supply and manufacturing costs, causing the demise of the combo after 17 years of production, but many models could still be found on store shelves.

== See also ==
- Combo television unit
- VCR/Blu-ray combo
