= Compact Video Cassette =

Magnetic tape-based consumer videocassette format

Technicolor Compact Video Cassette (CVC)
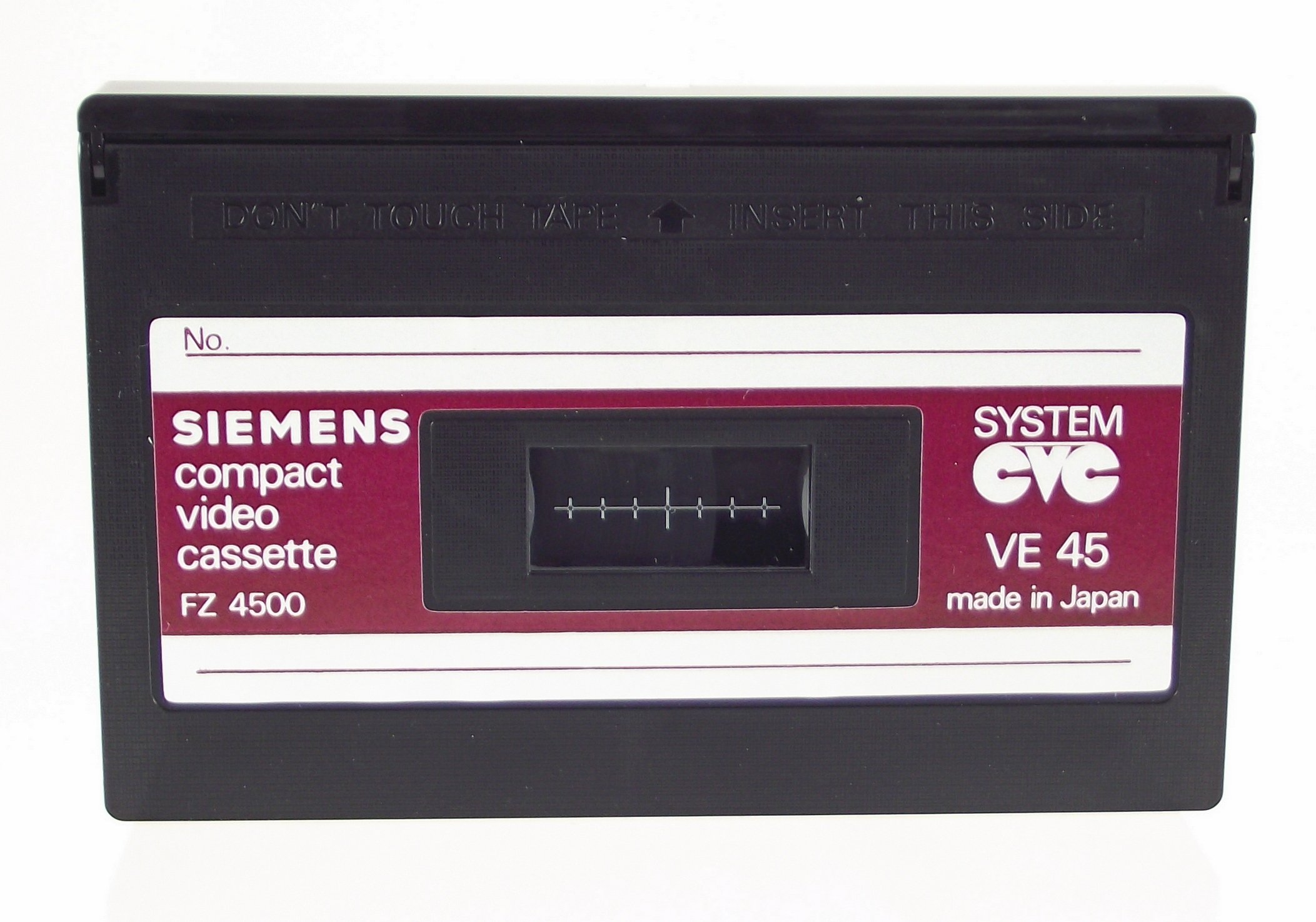
- Siemens "VE 45" Compact Video Cassette
- Media type: Magnetic tape
- Encoding: NTSC, PAL, SECAM
- Capacity: 30 minutes, 45 minutes, 60 minutes
- Read mechanism: Helical scan
- Write mechanism: Helical scan
- Standard: 525-line, 625-line
- Developed by: Funai, Thomson SA
- Dimensions: 10.5 × 6.6 × 1.3 cm
- Usage: Home movies, Video production
- Released: 1980

Compact Video Cassette (CVC) was one of the first analog recording videocassette formats to use a tape smaller than its earlier predecessors of VHS and Betamax, and was developed by Funai Electronics of Japan for portable use. The first model of VCR for the format was the Model 212, introduced in 1980 by both Funai and Technicolor as they had created a joint venture to manufacture and introduce the format to the home movie market. The system, which included the VCR and a hand held video camera, was very small and lightweight for its time.

== Design ==
The CVC format used a cassette similar in size to a 8-mm videocassette and was loaded with magnetic tape 6.5 mm wide. Unlike most other video cassette formats that enclose reels with flanges, the CVC cassette employed tape hubs without flanges similar to compact cassette, which made the design more space-efficient. Initially only V30 tapes were available which ran for 30 minutes, then later V45 (45 minute) and V60 (60 minute) models were introduced. The format was released for NTSC, PAL and SECAM television systems (with cassettes labelled "VExx") and, like most analogue systems, tapes had to be played on machines using the same TV system as the recording.

== CVC camera and players ==
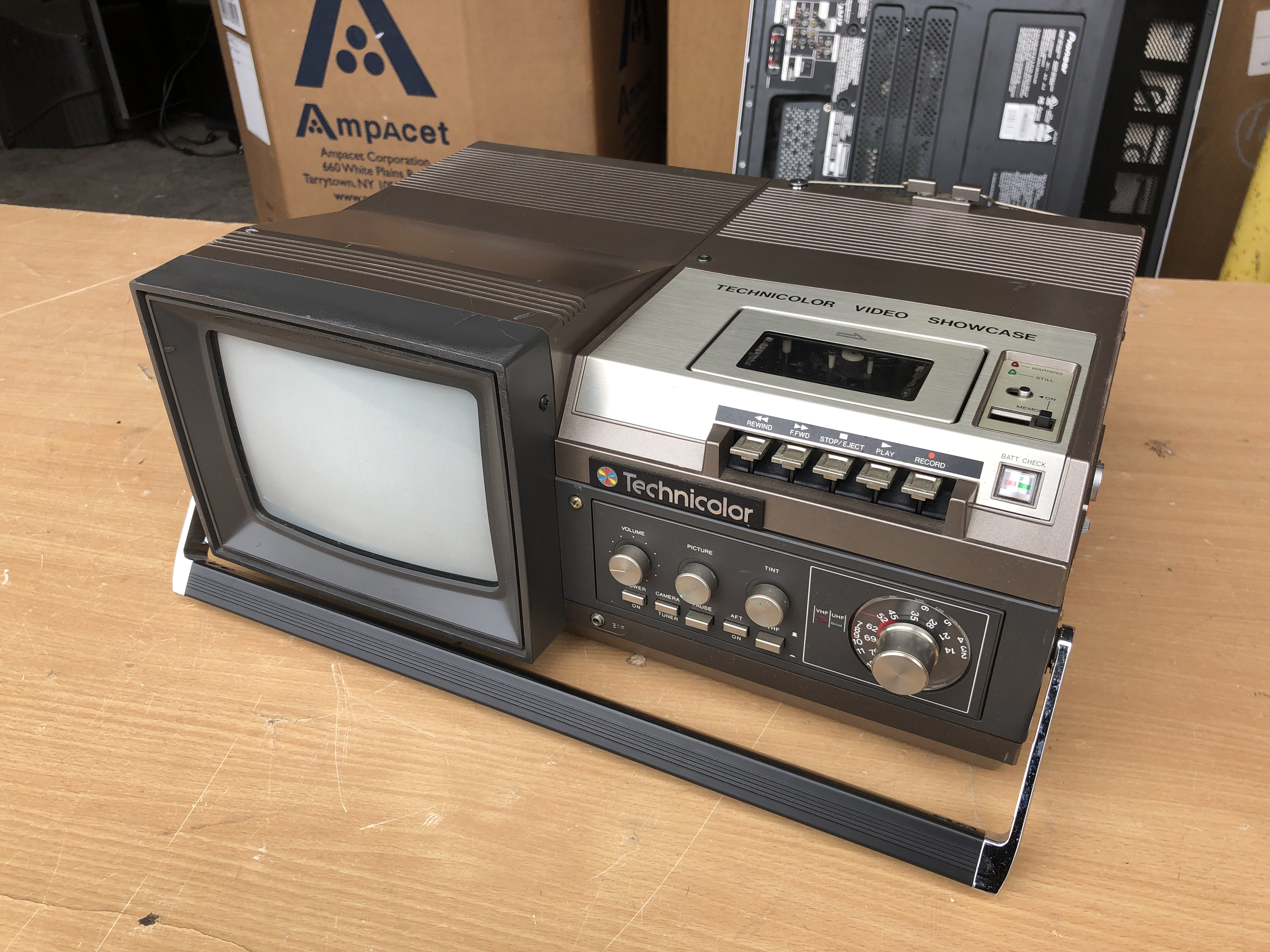
Technicolor CVC Videocassette recorder with monitor

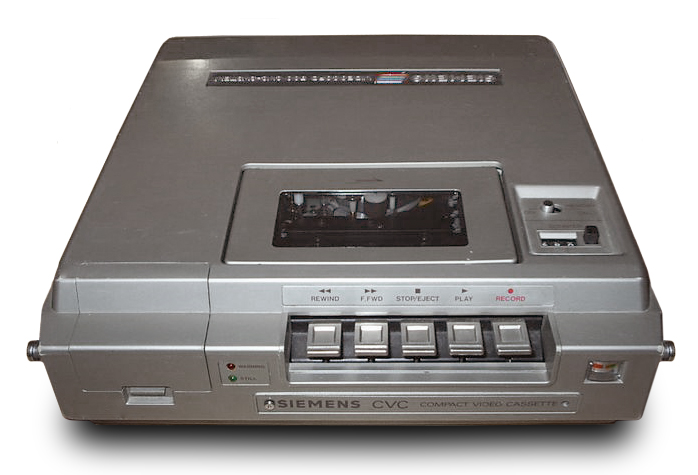
Siemens CVC Videocassette Recorder

Funai 212 came with a JVC model GX-44E hand held Vidicon tube camera with a zoom lens. Model 212D was the NTSC version and 212E was PAL for Europe. The deck and electronics from the 212 were also used to build the model 335 Technicolor Video Showcase, which included a colour video monitor, speaker and contained an internal 12V battery. A lightweight television tuner pack was available to enable the 212 to record off-air television programming, but since it contained no timer it was not possible to set it for unattended recordings. Grundig also produced a CVC-format VCR for the PAL market, the VP100, based on the 212E but smaller. The VP100 weighed only 2.3 kg with battery, and had a separate power pack. Despite some references suggesting otherwise, the VP100 did not support multiple recording speeds, and only recorded at the standard CVC speed. Still-frame and variable speed playback were supported in common with other CVC machines. Model 212 was also available in France as a SECAM recorder, the variant letter for this model is unknown. SECAM tapes play in monochrome on PAL players. Around 1990 TEAC produced CVC format machines in both PAL and NTSC for military use.

=== Specifications ===
- Two Rotary helical scan record heads
- Capstan-driven linear tape speed: 1.26 ips (inches per second) or (32.1 mm/s)
- Video signal-to-noise ratio: 43 dB
- Image resolution: 240 TV lines
- Audio S/N ratio: 40 dB
- Audio frequency response: 100 Hz to 8 kHz
- 7.16 pounds (3.25 kg)
- Dimensions: 9.2 × 10.2 × 3.1 inches (24 × 26 × 8 cm)

== Technical issues ==
Technicolor hoped that CVC would compete with 8mm film, but the Vidicon tube used for the bundled camera had poor low-light sensitivity, limiting its usefulness for home indoor use. An even worse attribute of the cassettes was the low quality of the tape stock which was prone to dropouts (appearing as lines of white snow) during video playback. These dropouts would show much more prominently than on wider tape formats. A drawback of the CVC player resulted in the mechanism's loading ring frequently failing to complete its intended travel as the decks aged. The load ring failure would render the unit unusable.

== Professional adaptations ==
The CVC videocassette format was also adapted for professional broadcast and ENG use by Bosch for their "Quartercam" (a.k.a. "Lineplex") format in 1982, much like how Betamax was adapted by Sony for the same professional & industrial uses as Betacam, as well as the M format from Panasonic, adapted from VHS.

Nippon TV (NTV) in 1981 also had a camcorder developed for them called the "CV-One" that also used CVC videocassettes, but using component video recording instead, much like Betacam, Lineplex, and M. The CV-One was followed by a newer model, developed by Hitachi under contract to NTV in 1982, called the SR-1.
