= Shintom =

Japanese electronics company

Shintom Industries Co. Ltd. 新東京無線株式会社⇒ シントム株式会社
- Type: Public (TYO: 6839)
- Founded: 1955
- Defunct: January 2008
- Headquarters: Yokohama, Kanagawa, Japan

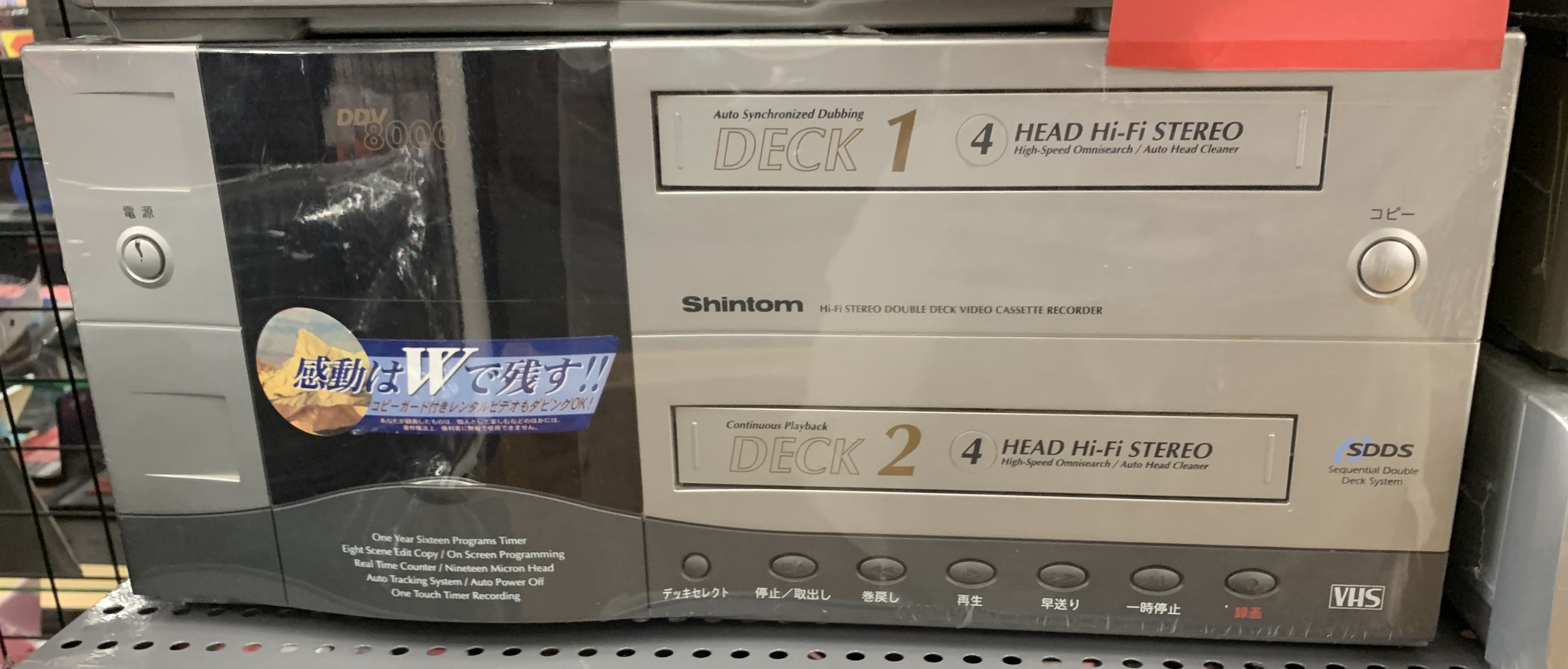
Shintom DDV 8000 douple deck VHS recorder

Shintom Industries Co. Ltd. was a Japanese consumer electronics company headquartered in Yokohama, Japan, first founded in 1955 and ended in 2004, after filing for Chapter 7 bankruptcy. Shintom was engaged in the development, manufacture, and sale of mobile phone, car audio, transistor radio, videocassette recorder, measuring instrument, and medical equipment. Shintom had two factories worldwide, located both in Japan and Indonesia. Shintom first held a stake with Audiovox in 1980 as an OEM supplier for Audiovox car stereos.

Shintom was mostly well known for designing, selling, and supplying the VHS transport chassis mechanism to various Japanese VHS VCR manufacturers during the mid-1980s to the mid-1990s. Funai Electric (its biggest customer), Sony Corporation, Aiwa Corporation, Toshiba Corporation, Memorex Corporation, and Private Label Store Brands joined in. Operations began in 1984 when Funai ordered the chassis mechanisms from Shintom, while assembling VHS players and recorders for several OEM customer brands. This business accounted about 70% of Shintom's total revenue, since Funai was their largest customer. Shintom's original chassis mechanism was built to industrial-grade, high-reliability standards, since demand for rental video cassette players skyrocketed during the mid-1980s, although most units ended up sold for consumer use. Shintom was also credited for developing the world's first geared-driven VCR dual-idler wheel system, which eliminated the need of a rubber tire found in earlier VHS machines.

== History ==
By 1986, Shintom began to market its own brand of VHS players/recorders lineup and other electronic devices to compete with other makes, along with industry's first 2-week, 6-event timer recording. A new North American headquarter opened in United States as Shintom West Corp. of America located in Torrance, CA. Shintom's original advertisement consisted of industrial-design, ruggedness, and simplicity without the high cost.

In 1992, without any warning, Funai canceled the contract after decided to build its own chassis-mechanism, as well as moving all VCR assemblies to China by 1993, until they made their last VCR in 2016. This sudden cancellation request by Funai permanently damaged Shintom's total revenue and investment capital, and it didn't allow sufficient time for Shintom to invest in new products. To prevent a freefall and risk going bankrupt, Shintom tried contacting Funai for several years if they could joint-merger but was denied each time, stating Funai is a family-owned, private corporation. By 1995, Sony stopped ordering Shintom's mechanism that was used for non-editing VHS VCRs, VCPs, and TV/VCR combos. Therefore, the VHS chassis mechanism business was dissolved.

During the 1990s, Shintom became the OEM manufacturer for assembled VHS VCRs, mobile phones, and car audio, while also producing measuring instrument and medical equipment for hospitals. VHS VCRs still accounted at least 50% of production business. Some brands included were Aiwa, Audiovox, Go Video, Memorex, Sansui, Sony, and Toshiba. When Funai left, Toshiba became the next major customer for assembled VCRs beginning in 1993. In 1996, Shintom won the contact from Go Video for assembling dual-deck VCRs. By 2001, VHS player/recorder production was eliminated when demand for DVD players rose sharply. Shintom chose not to enter the DVD player or television manufacturing market, predicting it would be too late, but instead, Shintom turned to the cellular phone market for Audiovox.

Due to slow sales of Audiovox cellular phones and lack of resources and funds in developing new products, with existing products quickly becoming obsolete, by 2002, Shintom was seriously in big trouble. Shintom's stock was removed from the Tokyo Stock Exchange for the first time, after three years of negative net worth value. In September 2004, Shintom sued Audiovox for $2.5 million in damages for dividends that didn't pay during the Audiovox merger. Shintom never approved the merger that created the preferred shares in the first place. The Court ruled that the preferred stock may not confer dividend rights, and Audiovox won the case.

Shortly after that, in 2004, Shintom filed for Chapter 7 bankruptcy, after six years of huge public debt, and the company is now dissolved with all factories and offices worldwide closed and later sold. Unipres Corporation took over Shintom's head office in May 2004 at Yokohama, Japan, and it's currently the main office today.
