= Bubbly (social network) =

Social voice service

- Developer(s): Bubbly (formerly Bubble in Motion)
- Stable release: 4.3.15 (Android); 4.2.4 (iOS) / March 5, 2016
- Operating system: Android, iOS
- Type: Social networking service
- Website: bubbly.net

Bubbly was a social voice service working across feature phones and smartphones. For feature phones, users can record their voice by dialling a short code and speaking, as well as listen to popular posts. Subscribers get a text with the short code number for dialling into Bubbly's servers to have the voice message play back. To cater to smartphone users, Bubbly was made available on iOS and Android platforms in April 2012.

== History ==
Bubbly was developed by the Singapore-based start-up previously known as Bubble Motion, which was founded by Sunil Coushik in 2005. The company has since changed its name to Bubbly.

In 2006, the company raised $10 million in its Series A from Sequoia Capital US and India. In 2008, they received $14 million in Series B funding from Sequoia Capital, Comcast Ventures and North Gate Capital.

In 2010, total subscribers on Bubbly surpassed 2 million.

The most recent Series E funding in 2012 took the company's total funding to $50 million from a range of backers including JAFCO Asia, SingTel Innov8, Infocomm Investments and Palomar Ventures.

Bubbly exceeded 25 million users in February 2013.

In July 2013, Bubbly announced having a user base of over 30 million subscribers.

The investors decided to liquidate the company in August 2014, but it was instead acquired by Altruist later that month.

Forbes listed it as one of the 15 most successful social networks to watch in 2015.

== Features ==
Bubbly was a social voice platform that allows users to create their own voice blog in 90 seconds and subscribe to celebrities. The latest release of Bubbly app on iOS and Android enables users to apply voice filters, effects, and background music to their voice posts. Users may also add photograph and text up to 140 characters, and share their post to other social networking services such as Twitter and Facebook. Bubbly has a payment engine that lets users on all of its platforms use carrier billing for Bubbly's premium products and services, which include subscriptions and in-app purchases. Bubbly also has a platform that lets users share voice messages on featurephones, smartphones, and its website, called Bubbly360.

== Noteworthy ==
In January 2013, English footballer Rio Ferdinand joined Bubbly.
