= VCR/Blu-ray combo =

Media player

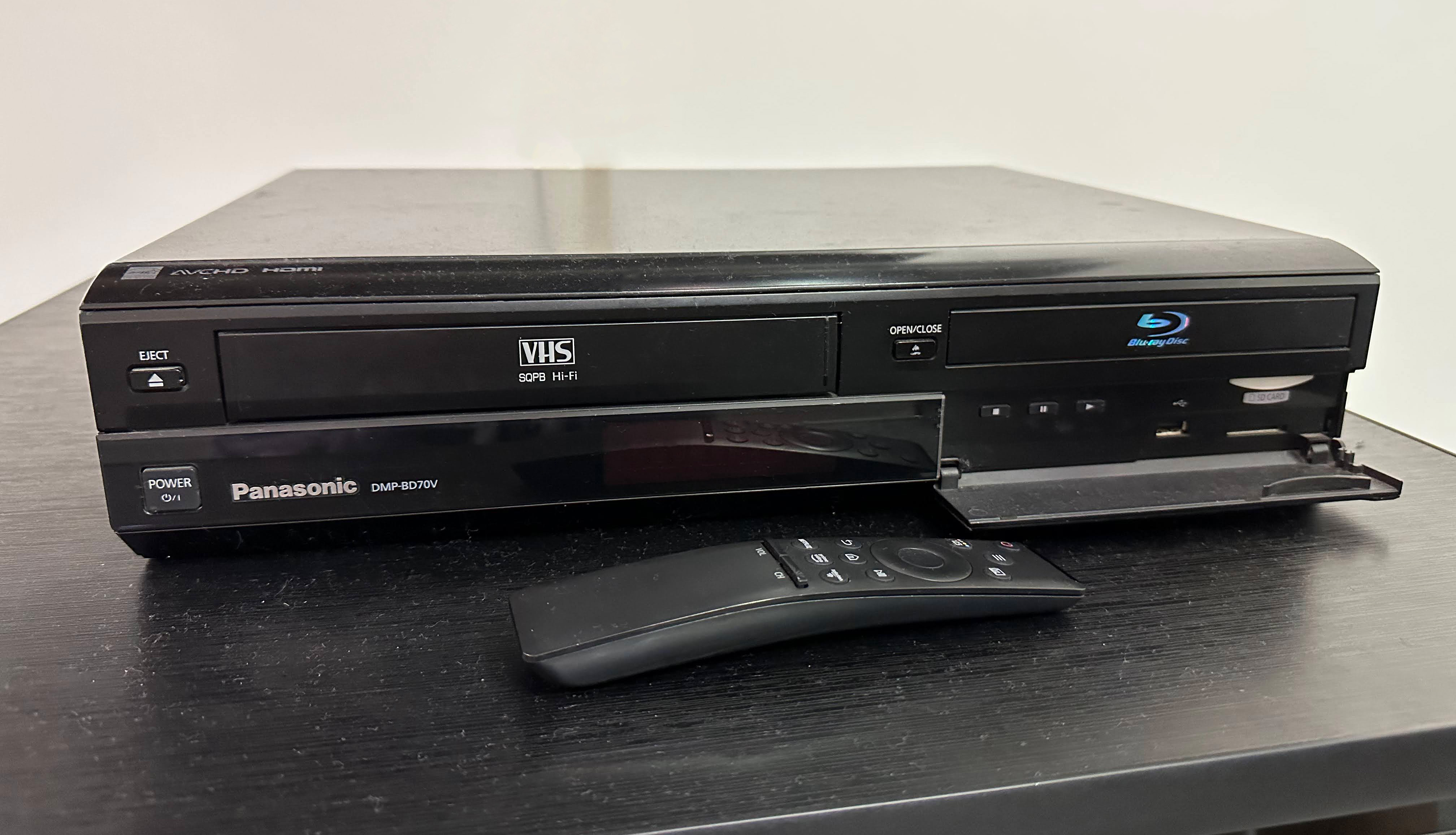
Panasonic DMP-BD70V, a VHS and Blu-Ray combo machine

A VCR/Blu-ray combo is a multiplex or converged device, convenient for consumers who wish to use both VHS tapes and the newer high-definition Blu-ray Disc technology.

When Blu-ray Disc players went on the market in mid-2006, the final major Hollywood motion picture on VHS (David Cronenberg's A History of Violence) had already been released. Nonetheless, some homes still had a large supply of VHS tapes due to its nearly-30 year history as a consumer device. New-old stock of blank VHS tapes are still available for purchase at some stores, and tapes still appear to be manufactured as of December 2022.

Very few VCR/Blu-ray combos were produced, some of which played additional formats including DVD, VCD, CD, SD card (and with it, MMC cards, since SD sockets are compatible with MMC cards), and/or USB media. Some models were also able to play BD Live media if connected to the Internet. Most of these formats are carried over from standalone Blu-ray Disc players, as most Blu-ray Disc players are designed to play DVDs and CDs in addition to Blu-ray Discs, and many Blu-ray Disc players come equipped with BD Live capabilities and/or SD card slot to have a still picture slideshow or show personal home movies.

These devices were among the only VCRs (alongside some later model VCR/DVD combos) to be equipped with an HDMI port for HDTV viewing upscaling to several different types of resolutions including 1080p, 1080i, and 720p.

== See also ==
- Combo television unit
- VCR/DVD combo
