= Combo television unit =

Television combined with VCR or DVD player

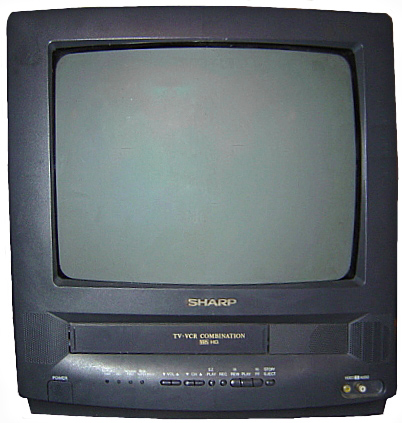
- A typical TV/VCR combo
- Inception: Early 1970s (experimental movie rental equipment); mid-to-late 1980s (mainstream market)

A combo television unit, or a TV/VCR combo, sometimes known as a televideo, is a television with a VCR, DVD player, or sometimes both, built into a single unit.

== Types ==
=== TV/VCR combos ===
During the era of their popularity, many of these units displayed product videos in stores or for other commercial displays. The main reason for this was that unlike most low-end, standalone VCRs, many included an automatic repeat play feature.

=== TV/Computer combos ===
Some fully functional computer systems or game consoles have been built into some models of TVs over time. Hewlett-Packard from 2008 had a version (the IQ800) of their HP TouchSmart line of computers with a built-in TV tuner, and even has a built-in DVR; also making it a TV/DVR combo which is a relatively rare concept. As of late 2006, Samsung introduced an LED TV with a proprietary operating system with Internet access to websites like Facebook, YouTube, Hulu, Netflix, and other sites. Other TV/computer combo equipment can simply just be flatscreen TVs with USB ports which allows USB flash drives and external hard drives to be connected to allow for audio and video playback, in which it can give a streamlined, fully solid-state profile.

Almost all modern-day TV sets have simplified CPUs and memory chips for basic functions such as channels and video settings, and video timing for LCD flat panels; however these examples are not sophisticated enough to qualify as significant examples. Other computer parts are used for real-time playback of DVDs on combo TVs with DVD player (and Blu-ray for more high-end models) functionality; however these dedicated functions alone don't qualify as significant examples either.

In the modern day, the distinction between a combo TV and an all-in-one computer have blurred with the modern smart TV concept.

In 2010, Sony introduced a TV with a built-in PlayStation 2.

== See also ==
- Handheld television
- VCR/DVD combo
- VCR/Blu-ray combo
- Internet television, the software equivalent of a TV/computer combo
