= Artificial intelligence in fraud detection =

Use of AI to help detect fraud

Large language models (LLMs) have been proposed as tools for use in fraud detection in a variety of settings due to their ability to identify complex patterns found in large datasets more quickly than most human auditors. One area which has seen a large scale adoption of LLMs for fraud detection has been the financial sector.

== LLM fraud detection systems ==
LLM fraud detection tends to combine two existing concepts from computer assisted fraud detection approaches; expert systems and continuous auditing. Expert systems were first developed in the 1960s and 70s, and were designed to mimic forms of error mitigation used by human experts in health research and the emerging data science research fields. These systems used an early form of deep learning. These systems have been used in accounting to detect fraudulent data, evaluate risk, and track complex financial transactions.

Continuous auditing was first implemented in the late 1980s as a method of frequent auditing checks which allow for faster fraud, error, and risk detection and subsequent response from large organisations. While this approach is possible for any setting where auditing may occur, the work of continuous auditing in large, complex, and diverse organisational structures, such as governments or international corporations, requires highly skilled auditing and adaptable data management systems.

Both expert systems and continuous auditing require recording and analysis of extremely large amounts of diverse data and a corresponding amount of time and resources to process and analyze these records. As machine learning and deep learning technologies become more widely available for commercial interests in the mid-2010s, their capacity to accurately process data at scale and to independently identify or verify patterns in those datasets was adopted by accounting researchers for use in auditing and fraud detection. The use of machine learning technology for fraud detection saw another surge in adoption as LLM companies (self-styled as "artificial intelligence") entered the public market in the early 2020s.

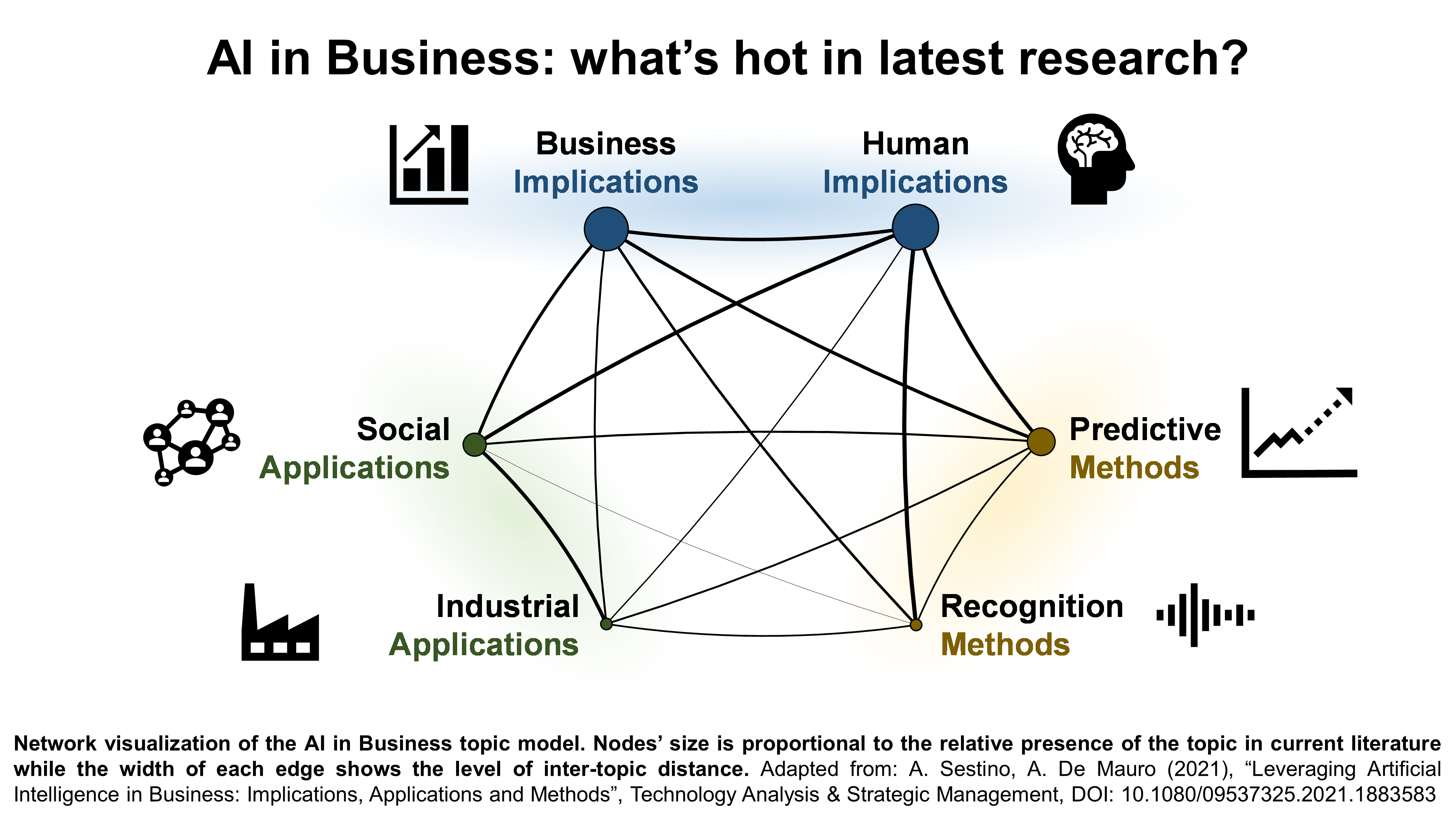

== Applications ==
=== 'Big 4' Accounting Firms ===
Deloitte created an Al-enabled document-reviewing system in 2014. The system automates the method of reviewing and extracting relevant information from different business documents. Deloitte claims that this innovation has made a difference by reducing time spent going through lawful contract documents, invoices, money-related articulations, and board minutes by up to 50%. Working with IBM's Watson, Deloitte is developing cognitive-technology-enhanced commerce arrangements for its clients. LeasePoint is fueled by IBM TRIRIGA (this product evolved into IBM Maximo Real Estate and Facilities) and uses Deloitte's industrial information to create an end-to-end leasing portfolio. Automated Cognitive Resource Assessment employs IBM's Maximo innovation to progress the proficiency of asset inspection.

Ernst and Young (EY) connected Al to the investigation of lease contracts. EY (Australia) has also received Al-enabled auditing technology.

Collaborating with H20.ai, PwC developed an Al-enabled framework (GL.ai) capable of analyzing reports and preparing reports. PwC claims to have made a significant investment in normal dialect processing (NLP), an Al-enabled innovation to process unstructured information efficiently.

KPMG built a portfolio of Al instruments, called KPMG Ignite, to upgrade trade decisions and forms. Working with Microsoft and IBM Watson, KPMG is creating instruments to coordinate Al, data analytics, Cognitive Technologies, and RPA.

== Advantages ==
=== Efficiency ===
The process of auditing an entity in an attempt to detect fraudulent activity requires the repeating of investigatory processes until an error or misstatement may be identified. Under traditional methods, these processes would be carried out by a human being. Proponents of artificial intelligence in fraud detection have stated that these traditional methods are inefficient and can be more quickly accomplished with the aid of an intelligent computing system. A survey of 400 chief executive officers created by KPMG in 2016 found that approximately 58% believed that artificial intelligence would play a key role in making audits more efficient in the future.

=== Data interpretation ===
Higher levels of fraud detection entail the use of professional judgement to interpret data. Supporters of artificial intelligence being used in financial audits have claimed that increased risks from instances of higher data interpretation can be minimized through such technologies. One necessary element of an audit of financial statements that requires professional judgement is the implementation of thresholds for materiality. Materiality entails the distinction between errors and transactions in financial statements that would impact decisions made by users of those financial statements. The threshold for materiality in an audit is set by the auditor based on various factors. Artificial intelligence has been used to interpret data and suggest materiality thresholds to be implemented through the use of expert systems.

=== Decreased costs ===
Those in favor of using artificial intelligence to complete investigations of fraud have stated that such technologies decrease the amount of time required to complete tasks that are repetitive. The claim further states that such efficiencies allow for lowered resource requirements, which can then be further spent on tasks that have not been fully automated. The audit firm Ernst & Young has posited these claims by declaring that their deep learning systems have been used to reduce time spent on administrative tasks by analyzing relevant audit documents. According to the firm, this has allowed their employees to focus more on judgement and analysis.

== Disadvantages ==
=== Job Displacement ===
The inescapable reception of computer based intelligence and robotization advancements might prompt critical work relocation across different enterprises. As artificial intelligence frameworks become more equipped for performing undertakings customarily completed by people, there is a worry that specific work jobs could become out of date, prompting joblessness and financial imbalance.

=== Initial investment requirement ===
While these technologies allow for faster processing of complex data sets using fewer individual tools, the LLM technology itself requires a high initial investment of resources by organizations looking to adopt them. These resources include data scientists to design and verify the initial run of the technology, as well as continued access to large amounts of data storage required for both the target datasets for analysis and for the computation resources the LLM tools require to process the data. Additionally, over the lifetime of the LLM system use, computer and accounting experts must periodically check and re-verify the LLM model to ensure errors are not introduced into it's algorithms and then repeated at scale. While cheaper 'off the shelf' systems may be purchased from companies, the algorithms used to operate these systems are often proprietary to the software owners and may be vulnerable to their own risks as a result.
