= Videocassette recorder =

Device which records and plays back audio-visual media

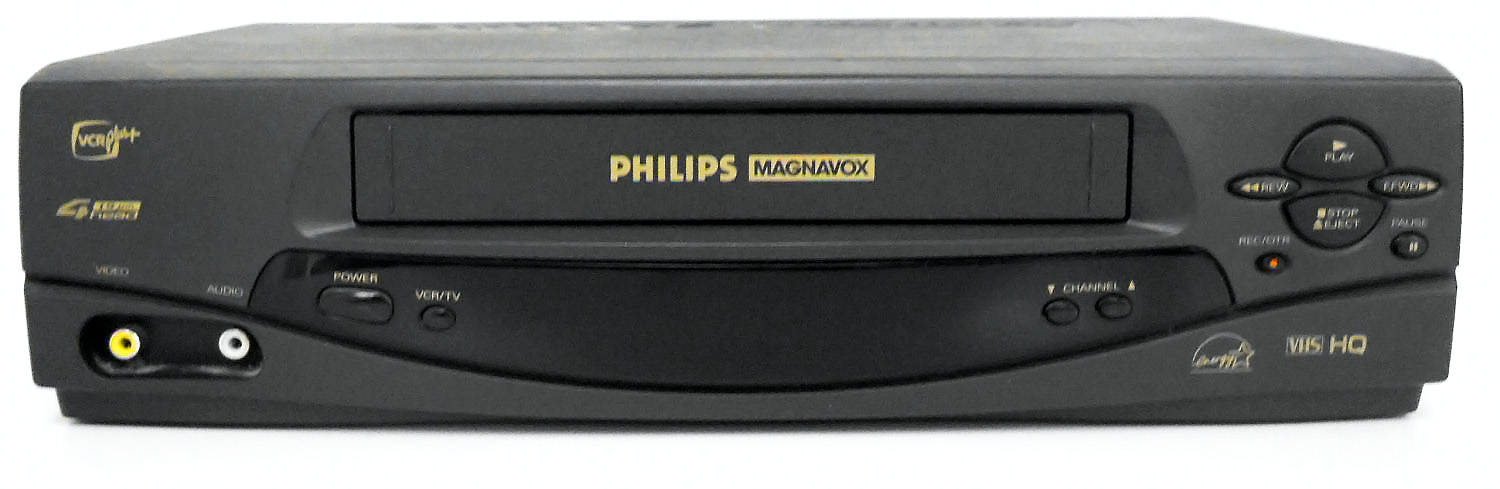
A typical late-model Philips Magnavox, VHS format VCR

A close-up process of how the magnetic tape in a VHS cassette is being pulled from the cassette shell to the head drum of the VCR

A videocassette recorder (VCR) or video recorder is an electromechanical device that records analog audio and analog video from broadcast television or other AV sources and can play back the recording from the tape. The use of a VCR to record a television program to play back at a more convenient time is commonly referred to as time shifting. VCRs can also play back pre-recorded tapes, which were widely available for purchase and rental starting in the 80s and 90s, most popularly in the VHS videocassette format. Blank tapes were sold to make recordings.

VCRs declined in popularity during the 2000s and in 2016, Funai Electric, the last remaining manufacturer, ceased production.

== History ==
=== Early machines and formats ===
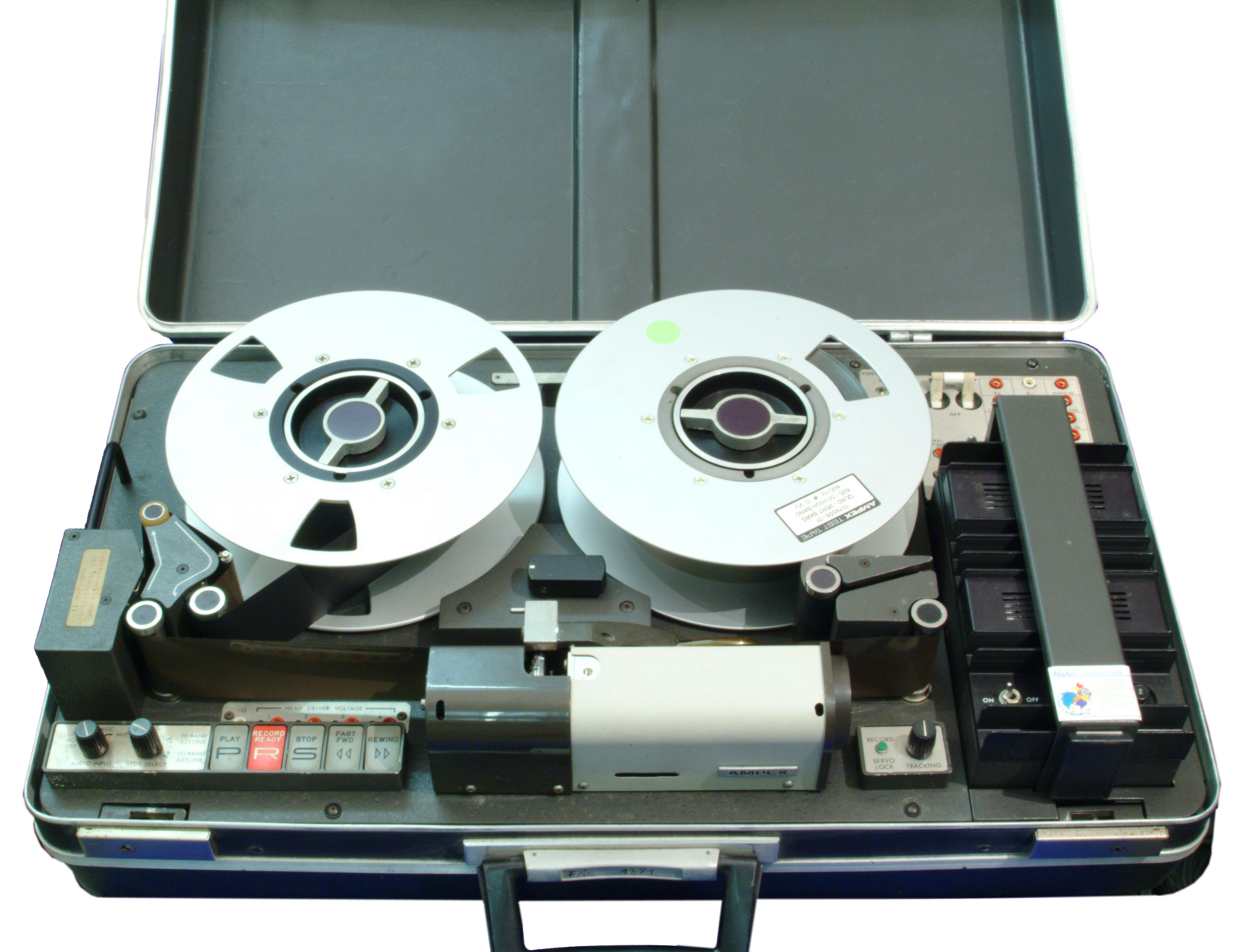
Not all video tape recorders use a cassette to contain the videotape. Early models of consumer video tape recorders (VTRs), and most professional broadcast analog videotape machines (e.g. 1-inch Type C) use reel to reel tape spools.

The history of the videocassette recorder follows the history of videotape recording in general.

Ampex introduced the quadruplex videotape professional broadcast standard format with its Ampex VRX-1000 in 1956. It became the world's first commercially successful videotape recorder using two-inch (5.1 cm) wide tape. Due to its high price of US$50,000 (equivalent to $592,000 in 2025), the Ampex VRX-1000 could be afforded only by the television networks and the largest individual stations.

In 1959, Toshiba introduced a new method of recording known as helical scan, releasing the first commercial helical scan video tape recorder that year. It was first implemented in reel-to-reel videotape recorders (VTRs), and later used with cassette tapes.

In 1963, Philips introduced its EL3400 1-inch helical scan recorder, aimed at the business and domestic user, and Sony marketed the 2" PV-100, its first reel-to-reel VTR, intended for business, medical, airline, and educational use.

==== First home video recorders ====
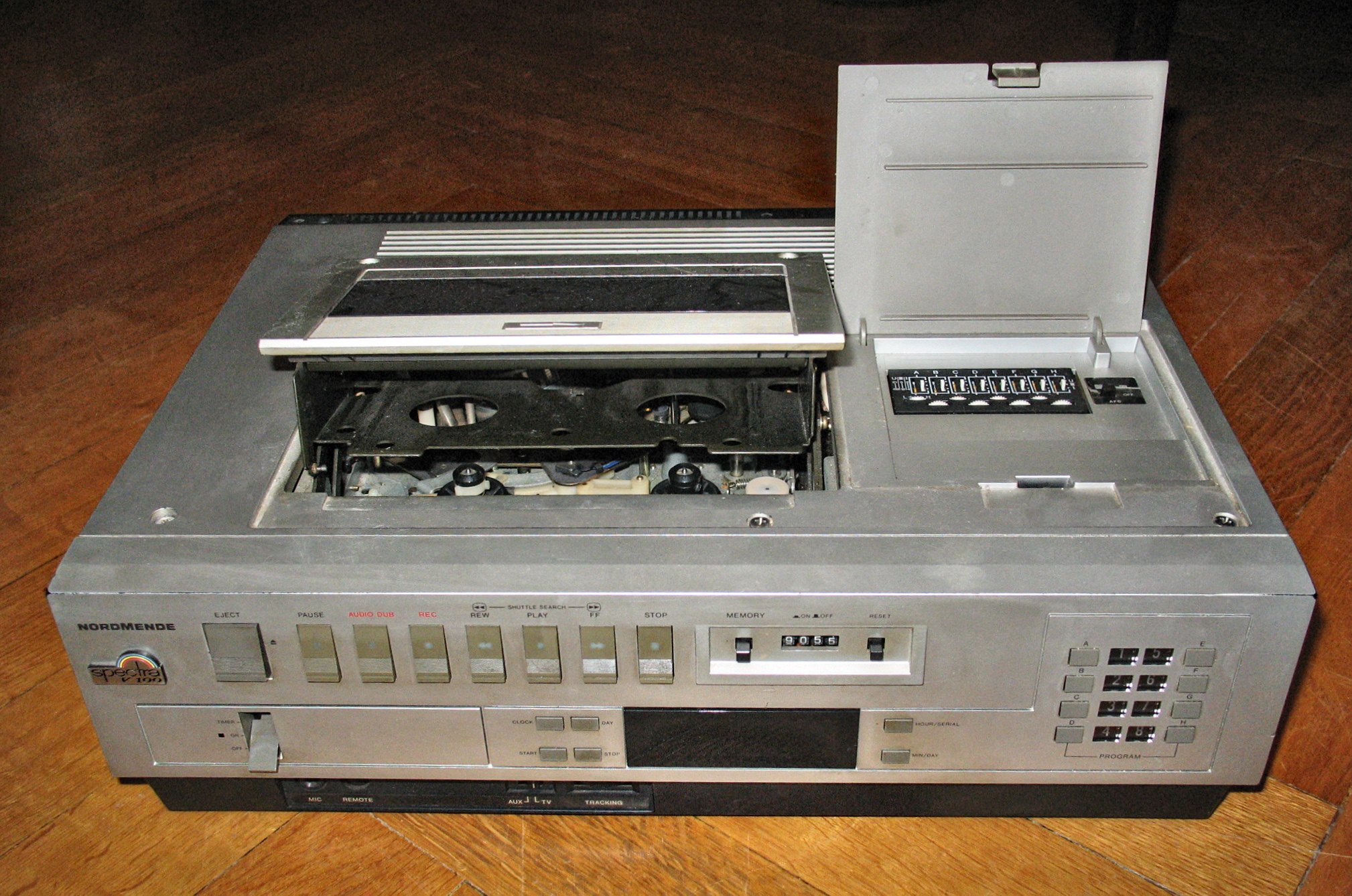
Top-loading cassette mechanisms (such as the one on this VHS model) were common on early domestic VCRs.

The Telcan (Television in a Can), produced by the UK Nottingham Electronic Valve Company in 1963, was the first home video recorder. It was developed by Michael Turner and Norman Rutherford. It could be purchased as a unit or in kit form for £1,337 (equivalent to £24,400 in 2025). There were several drawbacks as it was expensive, not easy to assemble, and could record only 20 minutes at a time. It recorded in black-and-white, the only format available in the UK at the time as color broadcasts were not available until BBC2 began broadcasting in color in 1967. An original Telcan Domestic Video Recorder can be seen at the Nottingham Industrial Museum.

The half-inch tape Sony model CV-2000, first marketed in 1965, was its first VTR intended for home use. It was the first fully transistorized VCR.

The development of the videocassette followed the replacement by cassette of other open reel systems in consumer items: the Stereo-Pak four-track audio cartridge in 1962, the compact audio cassette and Instamatic film cartridge in 1963, the 8-track cartridge in 1965, and the Super 8 home movie cartridge in 1966.

In 1972, videocassettes of movies became available for home use through Cartrivision. The format never became widely popular because recorders were expensive (retailing for $1,350 (equivalent to $9,791 in 2025)) and players were not available as standalone units. Cassettes intended for home use were encased in black plastic, and could be rewound by a home recorder, whereas rental cassettes could not be rewound, and had to be returned to the retailer in order to be rewound.

==== Sony U-matic ====
Sony demonstrated a videocassette prototype in October 1969, then set it aside to work out an industry standard by March 1970 with seven fellow manufacturers. The result, the Sony U-matic system, introduced in Tokyo in September 1971, was the world's first commercial videocassette format. Its cartridges, resembling larger versions of the later VHS cassettes, used 3/4-inch (1.9 cm)-wide tape and had a maximum playing time of 60 minutes, later extended to 80 minutes. Sony also introduced two machines (the VP-1100 videocassette player and the VO-1700, also called the VO-1600 video-cassette recorder) to use the new tapes. U-matic, with its ease of use, quickly made other consumer videotape systems obsolete in Japan and North America, where U-matic VCRs were widely used by television newsrooms (Sony BVU-150 and Trinitron DXC 1810 video camera), schools, and businesses. But the high cost – US$1,395 equivalent to $11,090 in 2025 for a combination TV/VCR – kept it out of most homes.

==== Philips "VCR" format ====
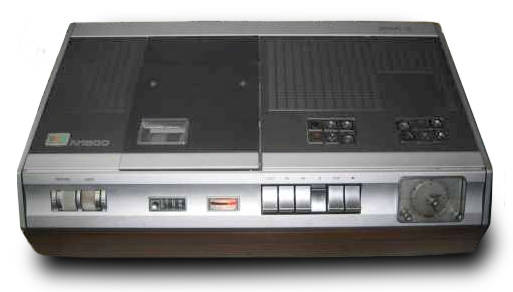
Philips N1500 video recorder from the early 1970s

In 1970, Philips developed a home video cassette format specially made for a TV station in 1970 and available on the consumer market in 1972. Philips named this format "Video Cassette Recording" (although it is also referred to as "N1500", after the first recorder's model number).

=== Mass-market success ===
The industry boomed in the 1980s as more and more customers bought VCRs. By 1982, 10% of households in the United Kingdom owned a VCR. The figure reached 30% in 1985 and by the end of the decade well over half of British homes owned a VCR. Prices had also dropped, ranging from $169 to $400 in 1985 in the US.

==== VHS vs. Betamax ====
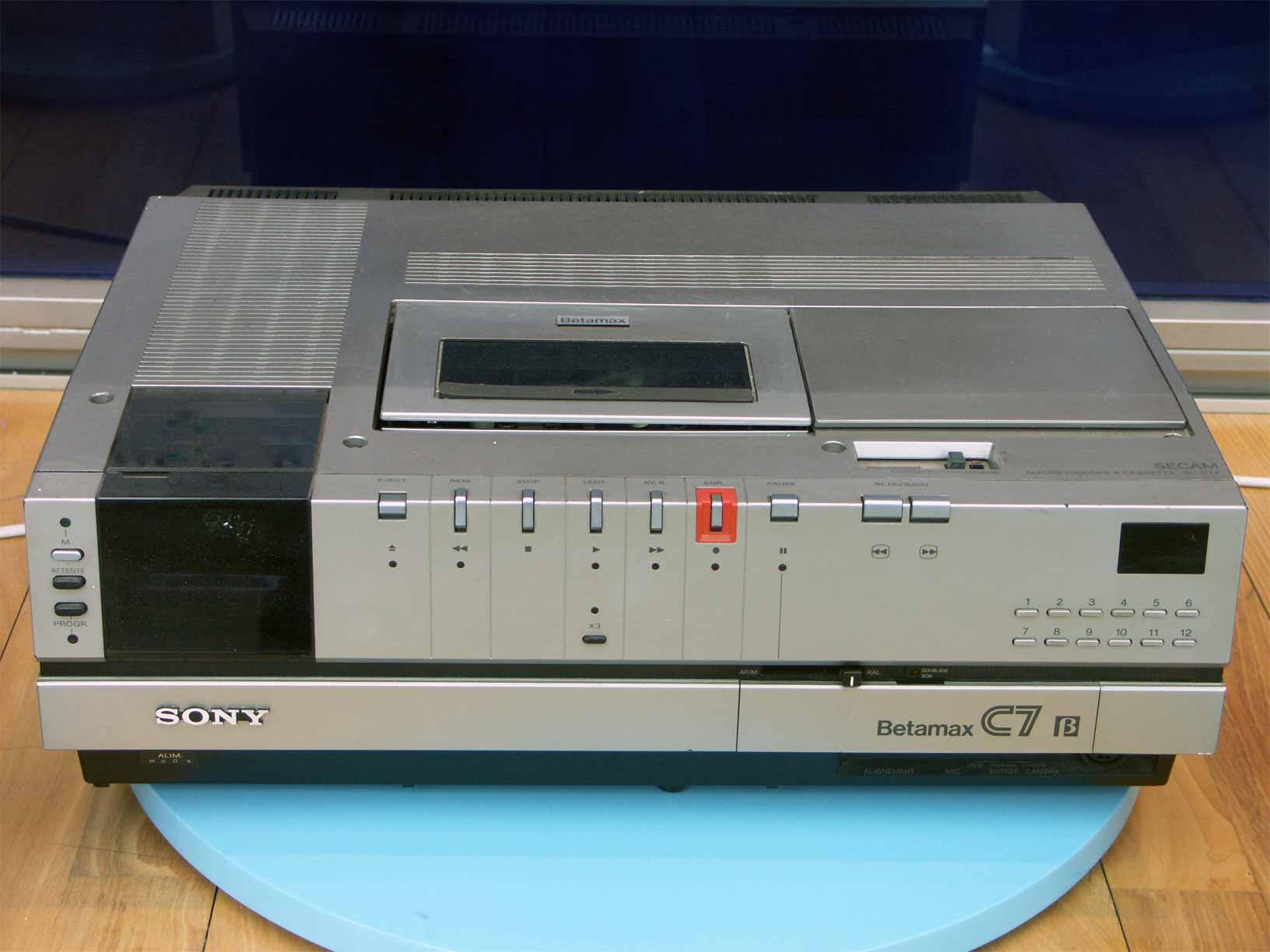
A Sony Betamax C7 VCR, c. 1980

Two major standards, Sony's Betamax (also known as Betacord or just Beta) and JVC's VHS (Video Home System), competed for sales in what became known as the format war. Betamax was first to market in November 1975, and was argued by many to be technically more sophisticated in recording quality.

=== Legal challenges ===
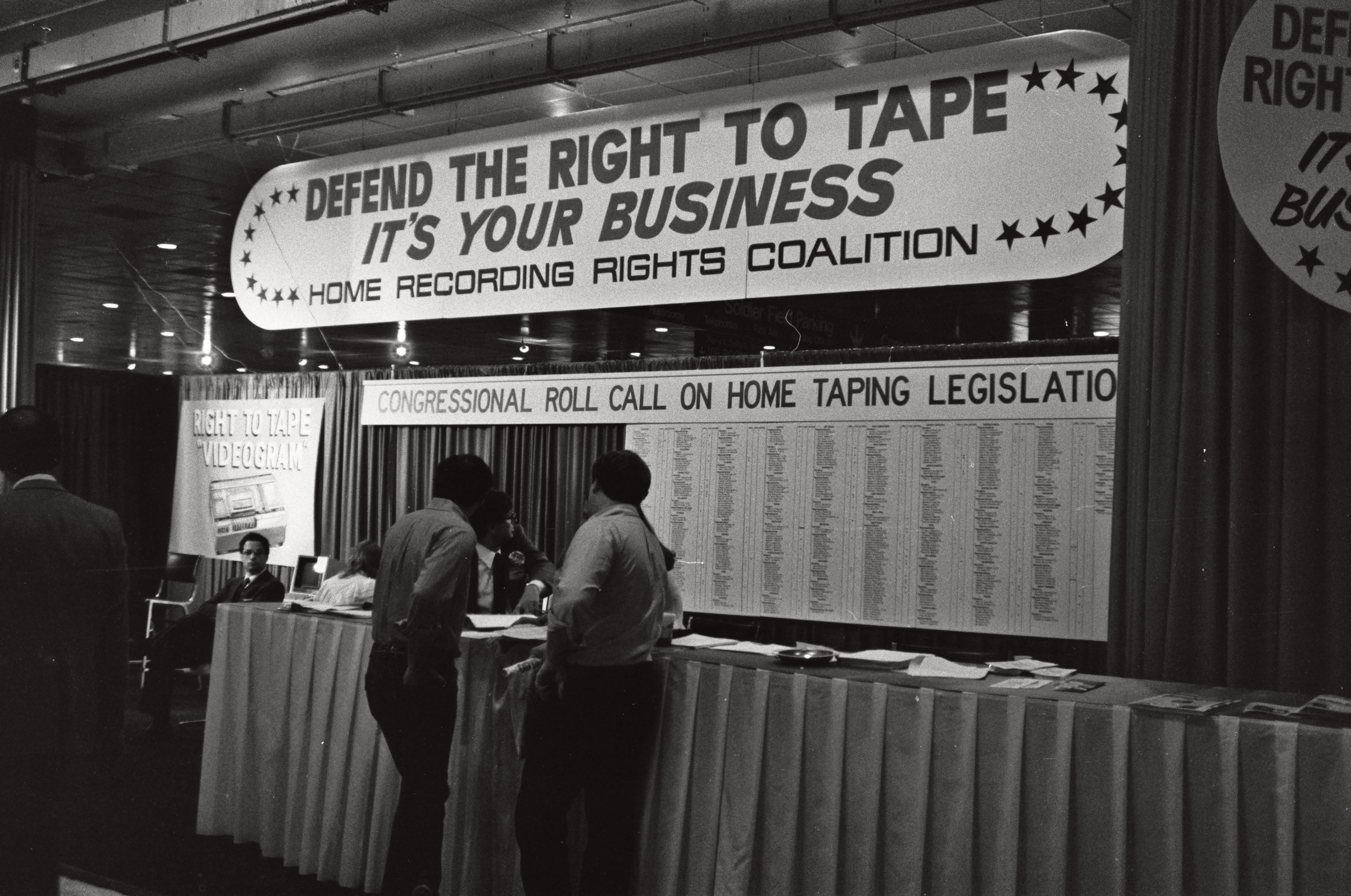
A 1982 booth at CES promoting the right to make home recordings

In the early 1980s US film companies fought to suppress the VCR in the consumer market, citing concerns about copyright violations. In Congressional hearings, Motion Picture Association of America head Jack Valenti decried the "savagery and the ravages of this machine" and likened its effect on the film industry and the American public to the Boston strangler:

I say to you that the VCR is to the American film producer and the American public as the Boston strangler is to the woman home alone.

— Hearings before the Subcommittee on Courts, Civil Liberties and the Administration of Justice of the Committee of the Judiciary, House of Representatives, Ninety-seventh Congress, Second Session on H.R. 4783, H.R. 4794 H.R. 4808, H.R. 5250, H.R. 5488, and H.R. 5705, Serial No 97, Part I, Home Recording of Copyrighted Works, April 12, 1982. US Government Printing Office.

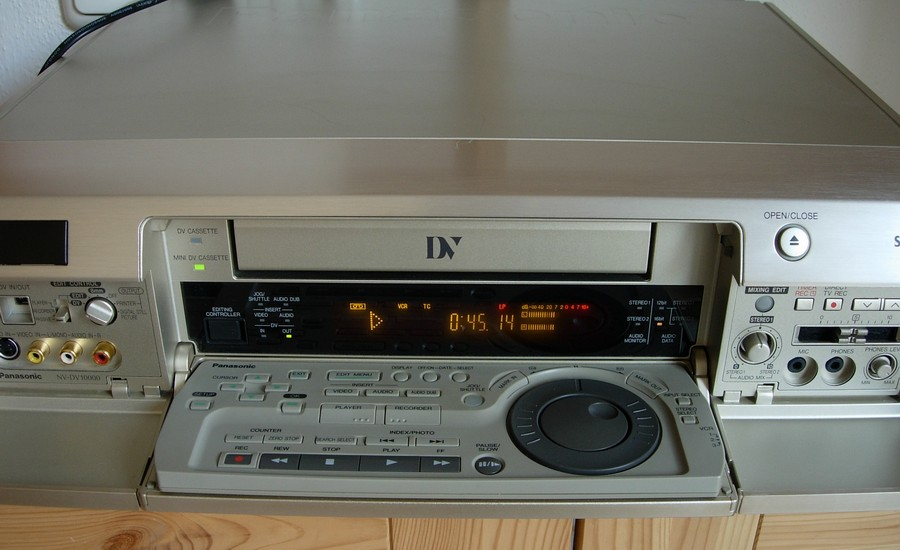
A Panasonic DV/MiniDV VCR c. 1998

In the case Sony Corp. of America v. Universal City Studios, Inc., the Supreme Court of the United States ruled that the device was allowable for private use. Subsequently, the film companies found that making and selling video recordings of their productions had become a major income source.

== Flying erase head ==
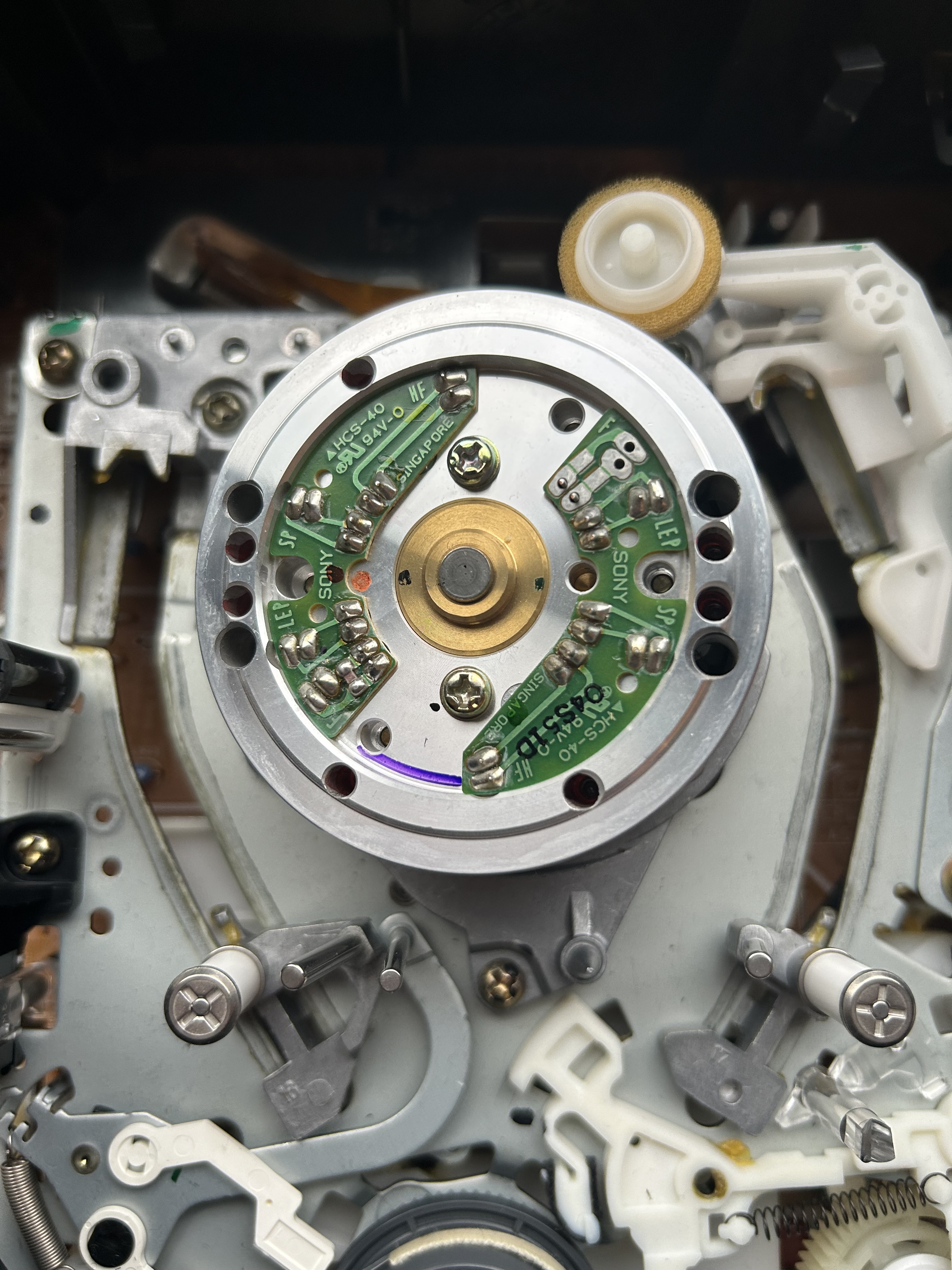
Sony SLV-998HF VCR with a flying erase head alongside the video and Hi-Fi audio heads.

Some high-end VCRs featured a flying erase head integrated alongside the video and Hi-Fi heads on the spinning drum. The head erases the old signal just before the new signal is recorded, enabling clean cuts and video inserts. The head is 40 microns wide, erasing both fields of video, removing the need for another head. Unlike the stationary full width erase head, the flying erase head eliminates chroma interference at the beginning of a new recording, as it erases the video almost immediately before being written to the tape.

== Shortcomings ==
Video cassette recorders are sensitive to changes in temperature and humidity. If the machine (or tape) is moved from a hot to a colder environment, there could be condensation of moisture on the internal parts, such as the rotating video head drum. Some later models were equipped with a dew warning which would prevent operation in this case, but it could not detect moisture on the surface of a tape. The presence of moisture between the tape and the rotating head drum increases friction which prevents correct operation and can cause damage to both the recording device and the tape. In extreme cases, if the dew sensor fails to function and stop the video recorder, moisture can cause the tape to stick to the spinning video head. This can pull a large amount of tape from the cassette before the head drum stops spinning. The tape will be extensively damaged, the video heads will often become clogged, and the mechanism may be unable to eject the cassette. The dew sensor itself is mounted very close to the video head drum. Contrary to how one might expect this to behave, the sensor increases its resistance when moisture is present. Poor contacts on the sensor can therefore be a cause of random dew sensor warnings. Usually, a "DEW" indicator or error code lights up on the display of most VCRs/camcorders, and on some, a buzzer may sound.

Magnetic tapes could be mechanically damaged when ejected from the machine due to moisture or other problems. Rubber drive belts and rollers hardened with age, causing malfunctions.

== Decline ==
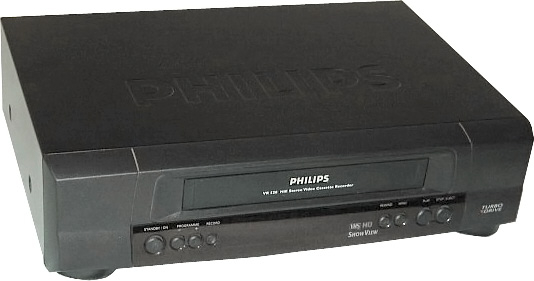
A typical VCR toward the end of their popularity. After decades of refinement in design and production, models similar to this Philips VHS format VCR were available for less than US$50.

Around the late 1990s and early 2000s, DVDs became the first universally successful optical medium for playback of pre-recorded video, as it gradually overtook VHS to become the most popular consumer format. DVD recorders and other digital video recorders dropped rapidly in price, making the VCR obsolete. In Canada, monthly shipments of DVD players surpassed those of VCRs for the first time in September, 2001. DVD rentals in the United States first exceeded those of VHS in June 2003.

The declining market, combined with a US FCC mandate effective March 1, 2007, that all new TV tuners in the US include ATSC and QAM support, encouraged major electronics manufacturers to end production of standalone units, with VCR/DVD combo decks being made since then; most of them then can only record from external baseband sources (usually composite video), including CECBs which (by NTIA mandate) all have composite outputs, as well as those ATSC tuners (including TVs) and cable boxes that come with composite outputs; some combo units that allow recording to DVD do include an ATSC tuner built into them. JVC did ship one model of D-VHS deck with a built-in ATSC tuner, the HM-DT100U, but it remains extremely rare, and therefore expensive. In July 2016, Funai Electric, the last remaining manufacturer of VHS VCR/DVD combo recorders, announced it would cease production of VHS recorders by the end of the month.

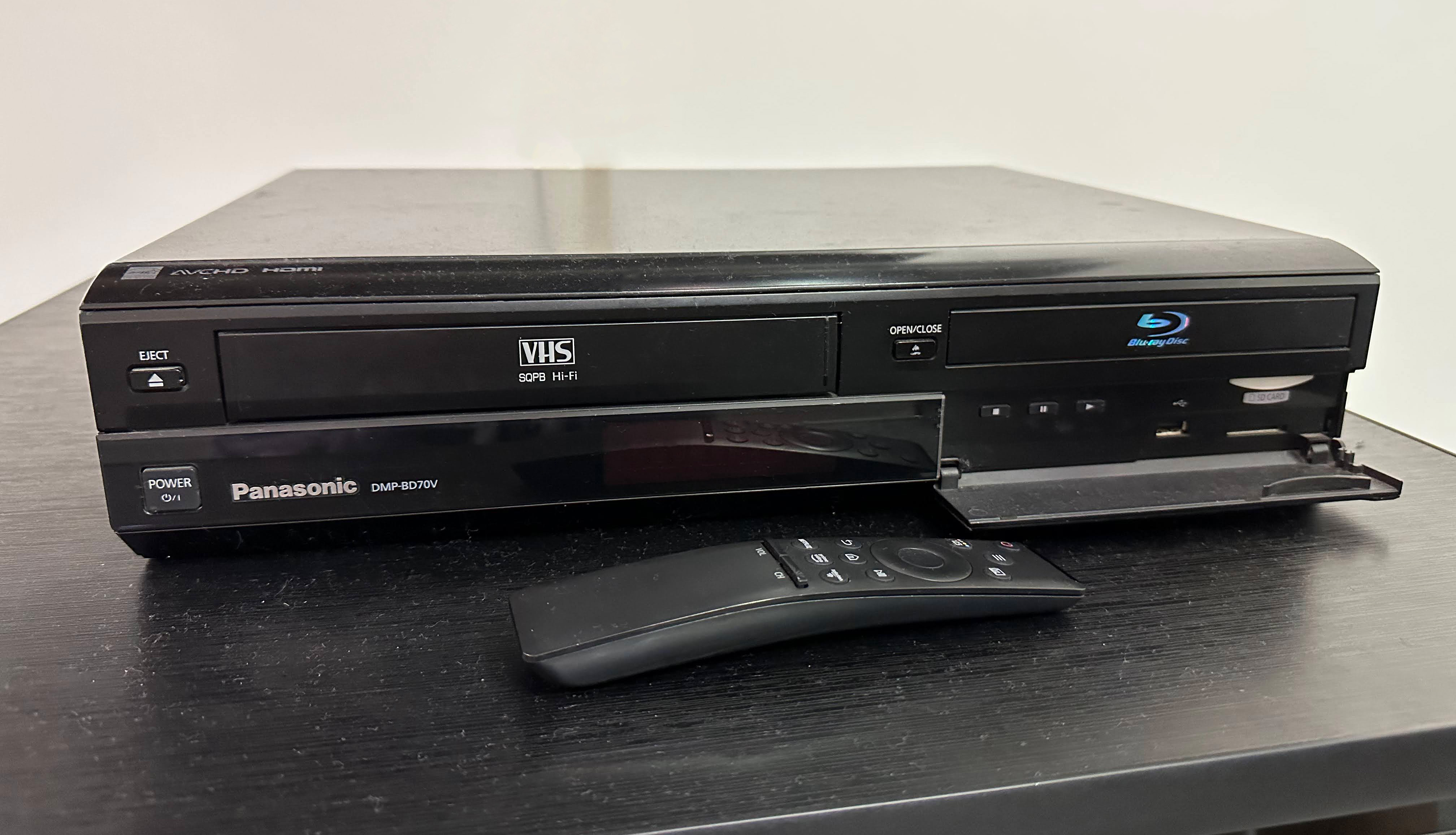
Panasonic DMP-BD70V, a VHS and Blu-Ray combo machine

As a result of winning the format war over HD DVD, the new high definition optical disc format Blu-ray Disc was expected to replace the DVD format. However, with many homes still having a large supply of VHS tapes and with all Blu-ray players designed to play regular DVDs and CDs by default, some manufacturers began to make VCR/Blu-ray combo players.

=== Quality ===
Due to the path followed by the video and Hi-Fi audio heads being striped and discontinuous—unlike that of the linear audio track—head-switching is required to provide a continuous audio signal. While the video signal can easily hide the head-switching point in the invisible vertical retrace section of the signal, so that the exact switching point is not very important, the same is obviously not possible with a continuous audio signal that has no inaudible sections. Hi-Fi audio is thus dependent on a much more exact alignment of the head switching point than is required for non-HiFi VHS machines. Misalignments may lead to imperfect joining of the signal, resulting in low-pitched buzzing.

== Variants ==
Most camcorders produced in the 20th century also feature an integrated VCR. Generally, they include neither a timer nor a TV tuner. Most of these use smaller format videocassettes, such as 8 mm, VHS-C, or MiniDV, although some early models supported full-size VHS and Betamax. In the 21st century, digital recording became the norm while videocassette tapes dwindled away gradually; tapeless camcorders use other storage media such as DVDs, or internal flash memory, hard drive, and SD card.

== See also ==
- Telerecording
- TV/VCR combo
- VCR/DVD combo
- Kinescope
- Write protection
- Sony Corp. of America v. Universal City Studios, Inc.
- Blu-ray Disc
