= Funai =

Japanese consumer electronics company

Funai Electric Co., Ltd

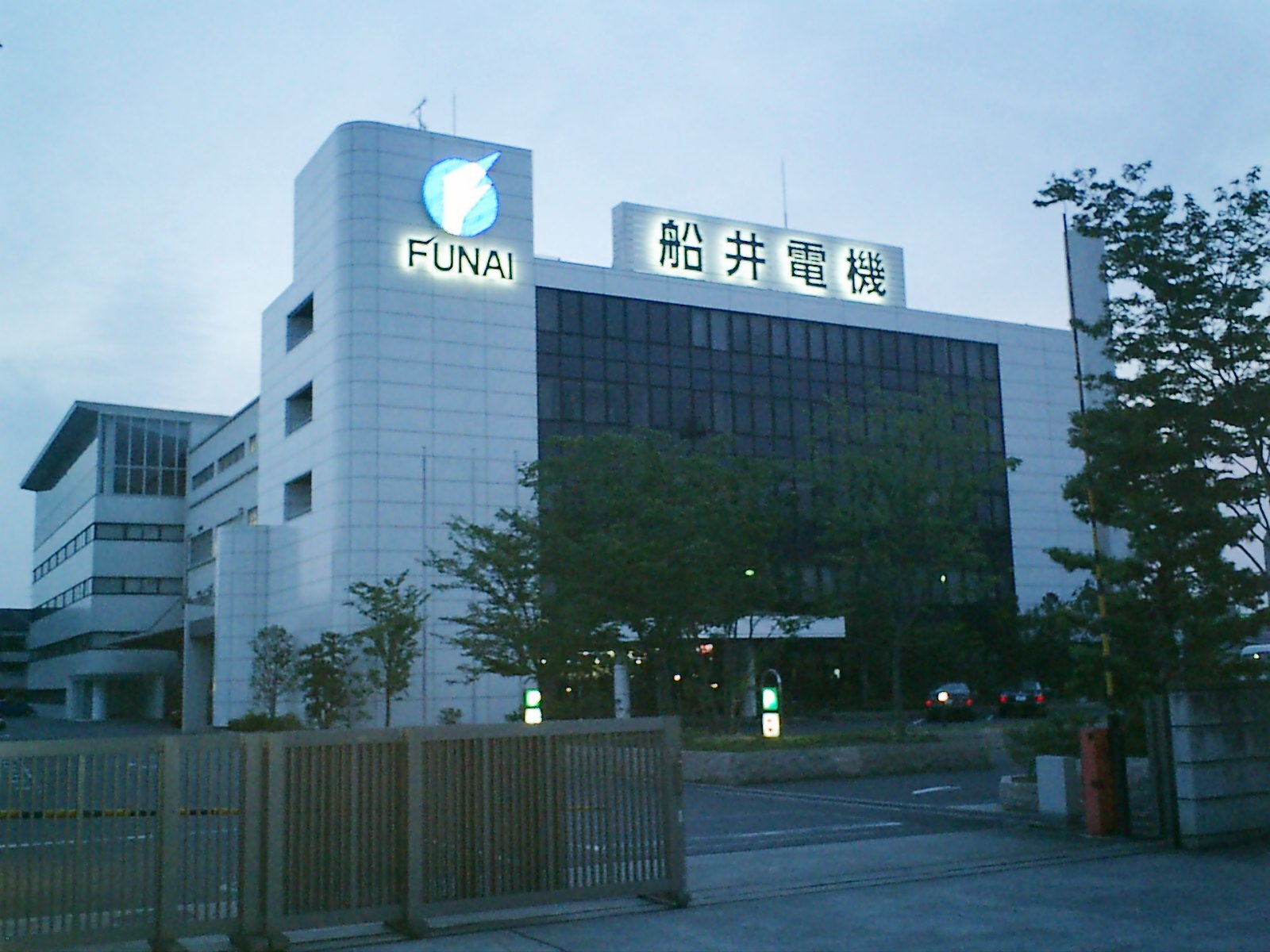
- Headquarters in Daitō, Osaka
- Native name: 船井電機株式会社
- Romanized name: Funai Denki kabushiki gaisha
- Type: KK
- Traded as: TYO: 6839 (until August 26, 2021)
- Industry: Electronics
- Founded: 1961; 65 years ago
- Founder: Tetsuro Funai
- Defunct: October 24, 2024; 2 years ago
- Headquarters: Daitō, Osaka, Japan
- Key people: Koji Bando (Chairman and CEO; Hideaki Funakoshi (Vice Chairman)
- Revenue: ¥246,100 million (2012)
- Owner: Funai family (39.39%)
- Number of employees: 2,861 (2011)
- Website: funai.jp

Funai Electric Co., Ltd. (船井電機株式会社, Funai Denki Kabushiki Gaisha) was a Japanese consumer electronics company headquartered in Daitō, Osaka. Currently, it is in liquidation. Apart from producing its own branded electronic products, it was also an OEM providing assembled televisions and video players/recorders to major corporations such as Sharp, Toshiba, Denon, and others. Funai supplied inkjet printer hardware technology to Dell and Lexmark, and produced printers under the Kodak name.

Its United States–based subsidiary Funai Corporation, Inc., based in Torrance, California, marketed Funai products in the US, along with Funai-licensed brands including Philips, Magnavox, Emerson Radio, and Sanyo. Funai was the main supplier of electronics to Walmart and Sam's Club stores in the US, with production output in excess of 2 million flat-panel televisions during the summertime per year for Black Friday sale.

== History ==
Funai was established by Tetsuro Funai, whose father was a sewing machine manufacturer. During the 1950s before the company was formed, Funai produced sewing machines and was one of the first Japanese makers to enter the United States retail market. Then, the introduction of transistor technology had begun to change the face of the electronics market. The Funai company was formed, Tetsuro Funai became CEO for 47 years and a US dollar billionaire, and the first actual products produced were the transistor radios.

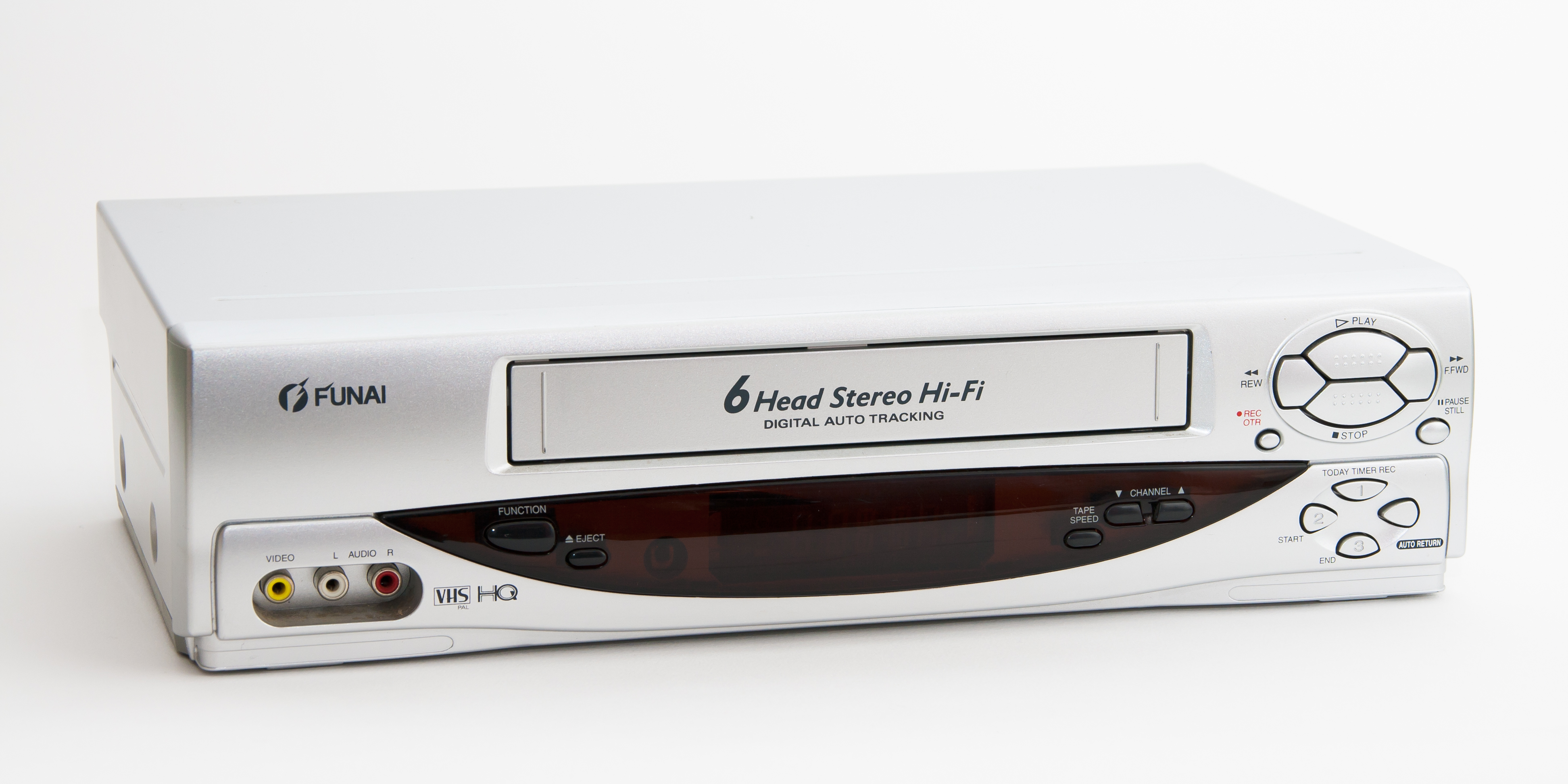
Funai VHS recorder

In 1980, Funai launched a sales and manufacturing subsidiary in Germany. Funai also developed the Compact Video Cassette (CVC) format in the same year, a joint development with Technicolor, trying to compete with VHS and Betamax. Sales were poor and not well-received due to ongoing VHS vs. Beta war, and the CVC format was abandoned a few years later.

Funai introduced an arcade LaserDisc video game, Interstellar Laser Fantasy, at Tokyo's Amusement Machine Show (AM Show) in September 1983. It demonstrated the use of pre-rendered 3D computer graphics. The game made its North American debut at the Amusement & Music Operators Association (AMOA) show in October 1983. In 1984, Funai would release Esh's Aurunmila a second LaserDisc game. This would be their last commercially released LaserDisc game. Their LaserDisc games suffered from poor distrubition and their third LaserDisc game, Interstellar Zangus, was never released.

Funai began to see rising sales of the VHS format, so in 1984, Funai released its first VHS video cassette player (VP-1000) for the worldwide market, while ordering all transport chassis mechanisms from Shintom for quick and efficient production. VHS format quickly became more popular and won the war against Beta format, due to Funai's unique on-time delivery for supplying rental VHS players for the porn-film industry and viewers. By 1990, Funai became the largest 2-head mono VHS video cassette recorder (VCR) manufacturer in Japan.

In 1991, a U.S. sales subsidiary was established in New Jersey, and it began to sell cathode ray tube (CRT) televisions. In 1992, Funai canceled its contract with Shintom, due to the rising cost of VCR chassis mechanism and the expensive Japanese labor, and decided to build its own lower-cost chassis mechanism instead overseas. This innovative decision significantly increased profits and rapidly drove down VCR prices. In 1993, Funai adopted a long-term strategy by opening two advanced factories in China, shifting all VHS VCR production out of Japan. By 1997, Funai became the first manufacturer to sell a new VHS VCR below $100 for the North American market, while the Philips Magnavox brand they produced for was the best-seller. Quickly, Tetsuro Funai, the founder, became Japan's first US dollar billionaire electronic CEO. Later, the DVD technology was formed, and by 2001, Funai sold its first DVD player for less than $100. By then, Funai's U.S. subsidiary had relocated to Torrance, California. Today, Funai is one of the world's largest producers of DVD players, and is now one of the major suppliers of electronics to Wal-Mart on Black Friday.

In 2008, CEO and founder Tetsuro Funai retired and stepped down from CEO to become chairman. Philips signed a seven-year contract with Funai to license, sell, and distribute Philips- and Magnavox-branded televisions in North America. In 2013, Funai acquired the option to buy the rest of Philips' consumer electronics operations and a license to globally market Philips branded consumer electronics. However, that purchase was terminated by Philips because of what Philips saw as breach of contract.

On October 24, 2024, the Tokyo District Court approved a quasi-bankruptcy proposal filed by one of the directors, who was a relative of the founder, without a board resolution. According to the credit rating agency Teikoku Databank, the company had approximately 46.15 billion yen ($303 million) in liabilities as of the end of March 2024. Approximately 530 employees were laid off immediately. Wages that were scheduled to be paid on October 25 to the employees who were laid off had been unpaid. All the unpaid wages and the "termination notice allowance," which is a monetary payment required by the Labor Standards Act, were paid by June 20, 2025. The retirement/severance payment is expected to be paid from the corporate pension fund as soon as it is ready. On October 29 the representative director and chairman, Yoshiaki Harada, lodged an immediate appeal to the Tokyo High Court against the decision, arguing that the company was still solvent and could continue its business under a rehabilitation plan. The appeal was dismissed by the Court on December 26, 2024. On December 2, Harada filed with the Tokyo District Court a petition to commence rehabilitation proceedings of the company under the Civil Rehabilitation Act. The petition was dismissed by the Court on March 14, 2025. The first meeting of creditors was held at the Tokyo District Court on July 2, 2025. It was reported that the total amount of the company's liabilities was approximately 81.9 billion yen ($554 million), while its assets amounted to only approximately 1.4 billion yen ($9.5 million) as of April 2, 2025.

In 2025, the U.S. trademark "FUNAI" and inkjet cartridge business (Funai Microfluidic Solutions) were sold to Brady. The US television set business with Walmart and the repair service business in Japan were sold to Skyworth.

=== Lexmark ===
Funai has made inkjet hardware for Lexmark International, Inc since 1997. In August 2012, Lexmark announced that it would be ceasing production of its inkjet printer line. In April 2013, Funai announced that it had signed an agreement to acquire Lexmark's inkjet-related technology and assets for approximately $100 million (approximately ¥ 9.5 billion). Funai acquired more than 1,500 inkjet patents, Lexmark's inkjet-related research and development assets and tools, all outstanding shares and the manufacturing facility of Lexmark International (Philippines), Inc., and other inkjet-related technologies and assets. Through this transaction, Funai acquired the capabilities to develop, manufacture and sell inkjet hardware as well as inkjet supplies. The thermal inkjet printing business was sold to Brady Corporation in 2025.

== VHS videotape ==
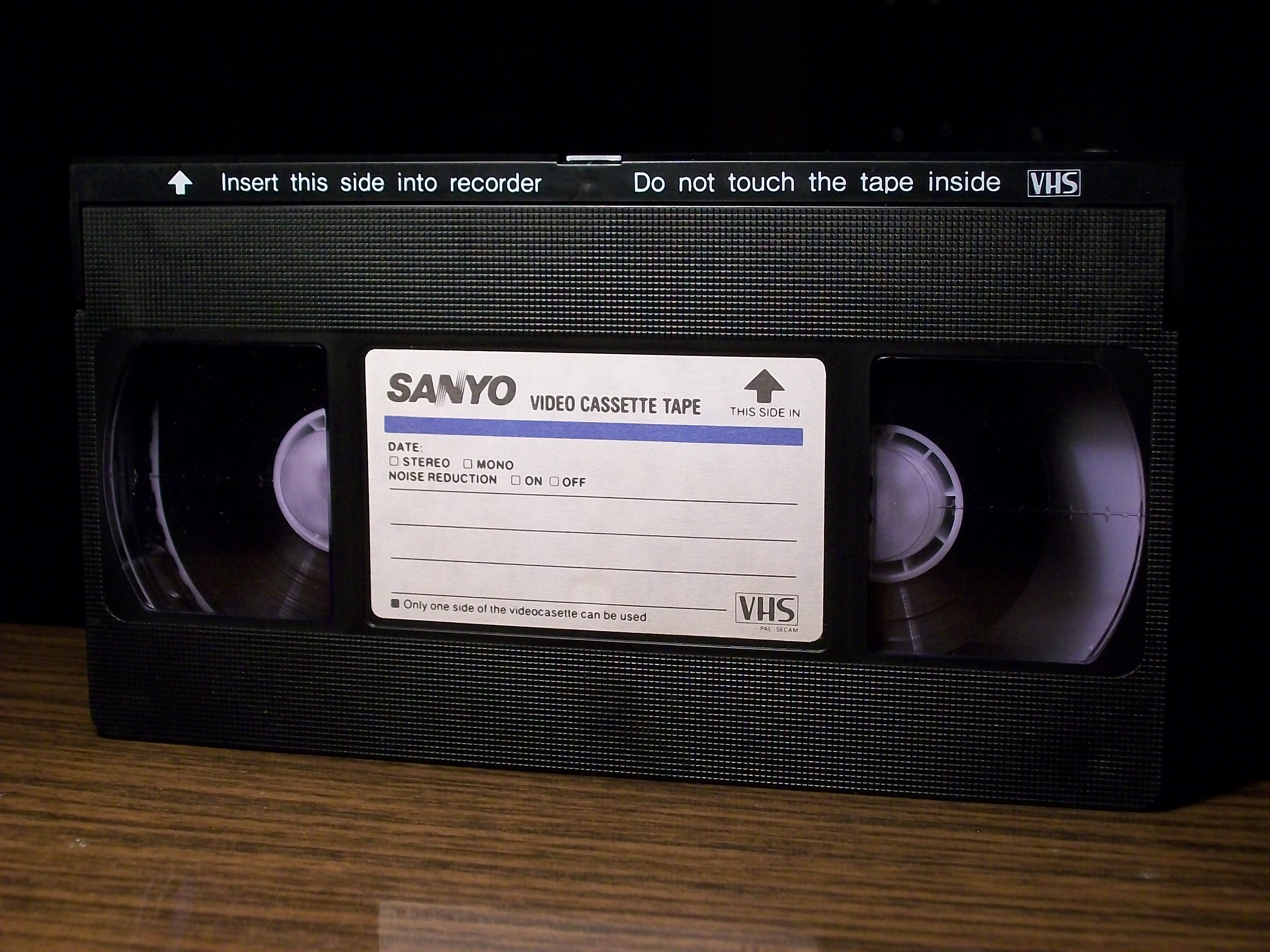
A Sanyo-branded VHS tape

The decline of VHS videotape began with the introduction to market of the DVD format in 1997. Funai continued to manufacture VHS tape recorders into the early part of the 21st century, mostly under the Emerson, Magnavox, and Sanyo brands in China, mostly for the North American market. In July 2016, Funai, the last known company in the world still producing VHS equipment, ended production after disappointing sales of its final VCR/DVD player combos.
