= Nomad Health =

Online marketplace for freelance clinical jobs

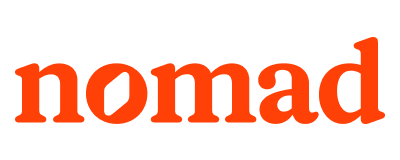
- Company type: Private
- Industry: Healthcare, Technology, Staffing
- Founded: 2015
- Founder: Alexi Nazem, MD (CEO); Kevin P. Ryan (Chairman); Zander Pease; Maxwell Laurans, MD; Ryan Grant, MD
- Headquarters: New York City, U.S.
- Area served: United States
- Services: Hiring
- Website: nomadhealth.com

Nomad Health is an online marketplace that directly connects physicians, nurses, and medical facilities for healthcare jobs, without the involvement of third party employment agencies. Nomad Health is based in New York City.

== Company history ==
Nomad Health was founded in 2015 by Dr. Alexi Nazem (CEO), Dr. Ryan Grant, Dr. Maxwell Laurans, Kevin P. Ryan (Chairman), and Zander Pease in New York City. From its outset, Nomad Health was built to connect physicians and medical facilities directly online for clinical temporary work, also known as locum tenens. The firm is a member of the Grand Central Tech startup accelerator program for the class of 2016-2017. In July 2016, Nomad raised $4 million in Series A funding that valued it at nearly $20 million. First Round Capital and RRE Ventures led the funding round, with participation from .406 Ventures.

The healthcare technology startup was mentioned in Fortune's 2017 list of 21 companies driving the digital health revolution.

In February 2018, Nomad raised $12 million in Series B funding led by Polaris Partners. Existing investors First Round Capital, RRE Ventures, and 406 Ventures also participated. In August 2019, Nomad raised $34 million in Series C funding led by Icon Ventures.

== Service ==
Nomad Health operates in the temporary medical outsourcing industry, in a marketplace in which medical facilities and clinicians can find each other. It makes money by charging commission fees to employers when people are hired as contractors, and competes with employment agency recruiters by setting its commission lower than theirs.

In July 2017, Nomad Health expanded its platform to include nurses in addition to physicians. Then in November 2017, Nomad Health expanded to include telemedicine.

In February 2018, over 30,000 clinicians and 1,500 medical facilities were using Nomad Health. As of August 2019, over 100,000 clinicians and over 4,000 healthcare facilities are using Nomad Health.
