= Proofpoint Systems =

Proofpoint Systems, Inc.
- Type: Private
- Industry: Cloud computing
- Founded: 2003
- Headquarters: Los Altos, California, United States
- Key people: CEO: Jim Hill
- Products: Browser-based software Precision metrics Organizational performance analysis
- Website: www.proofpoint.net

Proofpoint Systems, Inc. is a provider of software, systems, and programs that support individual and organizational performance. Based in Silicon Valley (Los Altos, California) and founded in 2003 by Jim Hill, Proofpoint Systems developed the first browser-based performance analysis software systems.

Proofpoint Systems has research and development facilities in Denver, Colorado, as well as sales offices in Phoenix, Arizona and Washington, D.C.

== History ==
=== Founding ===
Proofpoint Systems was founded in 2003 by Jim Hill, a retired United States Marine Corps officer and former Sun Microsystems executive. In the same year, Proofpoint secured contracts with the United States Navy, resulting an International Society for Performance Improvement award in 2005.

==== Initial product development ====
The patent for Proofpoint Systems' performance analysis support system (PASS) was filed on April 5, 2006, and published on October 25, 2007. PASS operates by guiding a user through a "detailed, consistent analysis process... helping organizational leaders accurately diagnose critical performance or productivity issues".

Proofpoint's first product, Comprehensive Performance Analysis Support System (ComPASS), was later developed as a web-based organizational analysis system for management consulting engagements. In 2006, Proofpoint Systems was awarded United States Navy contracts to support strategic planning of manpower, training, and education.

Proofpoint offers other products and services including: strategic planning, goal development, web-based diagnostics, and assessment.

== Corporate timeline ==
- January 2003 Proofpoint Systems, Inc. founded by Jim Hill in Los Altos, CA
- April 2003 Secures first engagement with US Navy
- November 2004 Moves R&D operations to Denver, Colorado
- February 2005 US Navy selects Proofpoint Systems for development of Human Performance Center
- April 2005 Receives Award of Excellence from International Society for Performance Improvement for its project "Optimizing Naval Warfighting Performance"
- January 2006 Unveils two new products, QuickPASS and ComPASS, as well as a free trial version of the powerful Performance Analysis Support System
- September 2006 Unveils new product, Goal Alignment System (GOALS)
- October 2007 Establishes strategic relationship with L-3 Communications Holdings and lists products on L3 GSA Schedule
- May 2008 Receives joint Letter of Appreciation from Department of Homeland Security and Department of Defense
- October 2009 Proofpoint Systems awarded Department of Defense Global Security Cooperation contract in direct support of the Defense Security Cooperation Agency
- April 2010 Department of Defense extends Global Security Cooperation contract with Proofpoint Systems
