= LaserDisc player =

Device that plays LaserDisc discs

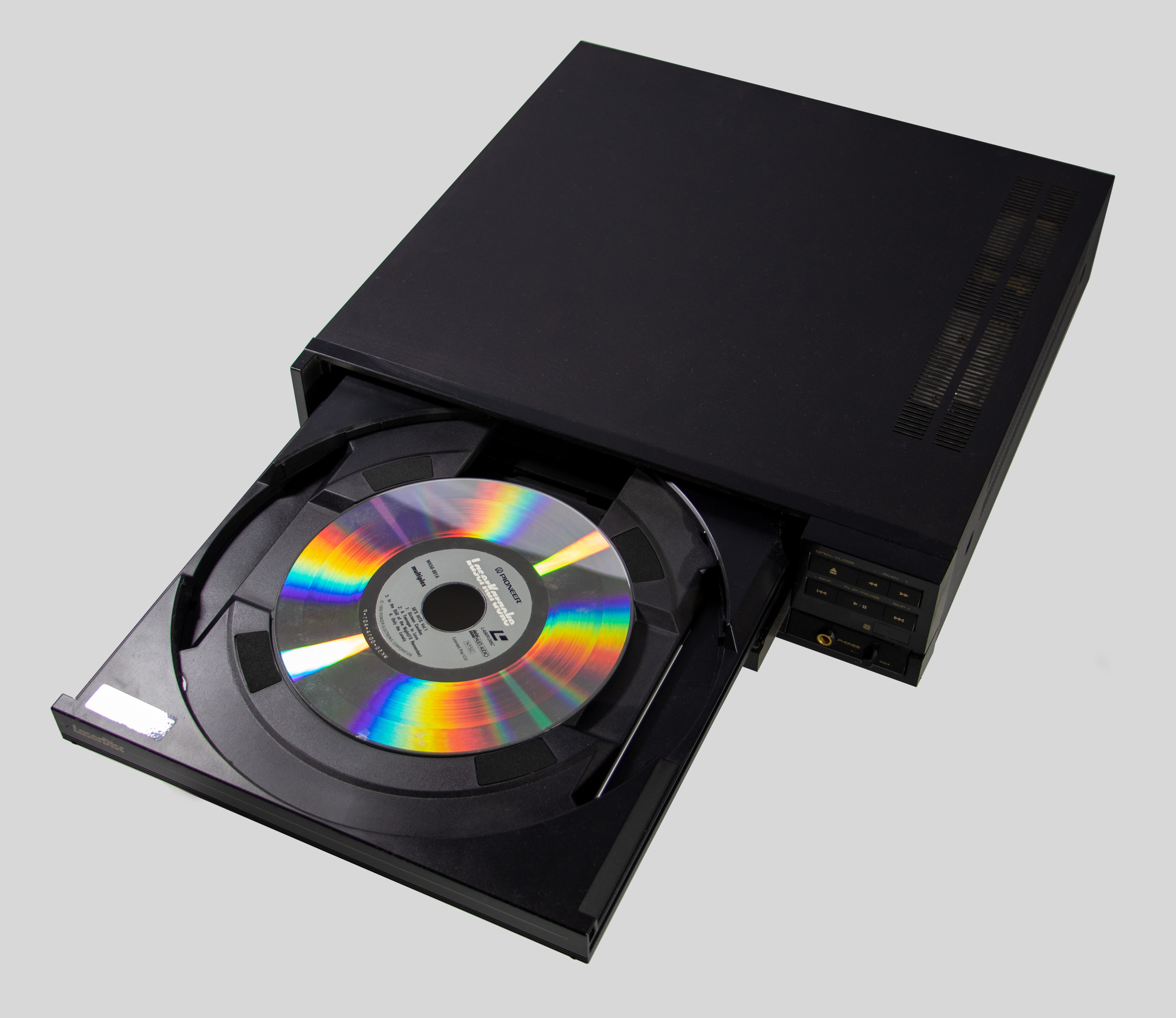
A Pioneer Laserdisc player (1988–1989) with an "EP"-sized disc in the front-loading tray

A LaserDisc player is a device designed to play video (analog) and audio (analog or digital) stored on LaserDisc. LaserDisc was the first optical disc format marketed to consumers. It was introduced by MCA DiscoVision in 1978.

From 1978 until 1984, all LaserDisc player models read discs by using a helium–neon laser. In 1984, Pioneer Corporation introduced the first consumer player with a solid-state laser diode. This model, the Pioneer LD-700, was also the first LaserDisc player with a front-loading disc bay instead of a top-loading one. Pioneer became the market leader in LaserDisc technology.

In the 1990s, Pioneer and others produced a small number of high-definition video player models, which employed multiple sub-Nyquist sampling encoding (MUSE) technology.

In 1996, Pioneer distributed their first DVD player in Japan, a combination Laserdisc/DVD player, model DVL-9.

Pioneer announced the end of LaserDisc player production in January 2009. The last models Pioneer produced were the DVL-919 (an LD/DVD player), CLD-R5 (an LD/CD player), DVK-900 (an LD/DVD karaoke system), and DVL-K88 (an LD/DVD karaoke player).

== Laser technology ==
=== Tube lasers ===
The earliest players employed gas helium–neon laser tubes to read discs and had a red-orange light with a wavelength of 628 nm, while later solid-state players used infrared semiconductor laser diodes with a wavelength of 780 nm. Both the Magnavox Magnavision and the Pioneer LD players used the same model of laser tube. From 1978 to 1984, all LaserDisc players, either industrial or consumer, used helium-neon laser tubes.

=== Solid-state lasers ===
In March 1984, Pioneer introduced the first consumer player with a solid-state laser, the LD-700. It was also the first LD player to load from the front and not the top. One year earlier Hitachi introduced an expensive industrial player with a laser diode, but the player, which had poor picture quality due to an inadequate drop-out compensator, was made only in limited quantities. After Pioneer released the LD-700, gas lasers were no longer used in consumer players, despite their advantages, although Philips continued to use gas lasers in their industrial units until 1985. Helium-Neon gas lasers had a shorter-wavelength laser that created a much smaller spot on the disc, leading to better tracking of imperfectly manufactured discs, such as an off-center hole punch or slightly eccentric tracks. The use of a solid state laser diode necessitated the introduction of the tilt-servo mechanism in LD players; this physically tilted the entire laser table, keeping it parallel with the disc, thus ensuring the larger laser beam spot was always perfectly circular and helping to reduce or eliminate crosstalk on warped CLV discs. In addition, the gas laser was less sensitive to external vibration, a must in certain industrial environments, and generated less photon-shot noise than the solid-state laser diode, resulting in a cleaner, less "busy" on-screen image.

==== Picture quality ====
The picture produced by the LD-700's laser could be instantly recognized at the time; it was slightly softer, and large expanses of color in the image, such as a blue sky, would show streaking artifacts. Also, the infrared laser did not cope as well with disc manufacturing defects, such as dirt trapped under the surface of the disc (inclusions), an off-center hole or track errors created during mastering, such as track-to-track "kissing" (tracks touching). Because of this, collectors with large MCA DiscoVision collections (DiscoVision discs had just those type of above mentioned defects) tended to use tube-based LaserDisc players, since they played these discs better. In addition to being the first LaserDisc player to use a laser diode, the Pioneer LD-700 was also the first player ever to have the aforementioned "tilt" servo, which was arguably one of the greatest advances in LaserDisc players, providing superior tracking.

== Mechanisms for changing discs ==
Most LaserDisc players required the user to manually turn the disc over to play the other side. A number of players (all diode laser based) were made that were capable of playing both sides of the disc automatically; at the end of the first side, or at the viewer's command, the machine would reverse the direction of the disc's rotation, simultaneously moving the laser pickup head to the other side of the disc, and then initiate playback. Since LDs are made up of two single sided discs glued together, the auto-reverse player would center each disc side individually. LaserDisc players used either a simple U-shaped reversing mechanism, known as "Epsilon Turn", or technique known as "Gamma Turn", where the player physically rotated the laser reading head 180° as it moved from one side of the disc to the other, ensuring that the laser retained the same playback orientation on both sides of the disc. Some players even had twin laser reading circuits to eliminate excessive servos.

=== Multi-disc players ===
While Pioneer produced some industrial "jukeboxes" that held more than 50 discs, one company offered, for a short time in 1984, a "LaserStack" unit that required the user to physically remove the player lid for installation and attached to the top of the Pioneer LD-600, LD-1100 or the Sylvania/Magnavox clones. LaserStack held up to 10 discs and could automatically load or remove them from the player or change sides in around 15 seconds. A version for the Magnavox Magnavision and Pioneer VP-1000 was announced, as was a model for the front-loading players, but the company went out of business before the units were available.

Only one consumer player, the LD-W1 (it was also released industrially too), was made that could hold more than a single disc; the W1 held two discs and could automatically change discs and sides by rotating the entire mechanism, including both the laser and turntable. Electrically, the LD-W1 was identical to the Elite LD-S1. The LD-W1 remained in the Pioneer catalog for many years and received many improvements: While the first version of the W1 had only 2X oversampling and 16-bit D/A converters in the digital audio, the later units had 4X oversampling with 20-bit D/A converters. The video noise reduction was improved, too, sharpening the picture and reducing disc noise while eliminating the artifacts it caused. In addition, high-frequency response in the FM video demodulator and A/D-D/A converters was extended and flattened, increasing resolution and reducing visible digital artifacts. The W1's player software was refined too, making disc and side-changing faster, plus, during side or disc changes, it grabbed a still-frame closer to the actual end-of-program instead of just any frame from the side's last five minutes.

== Industrial LaserDisc players ==
The Pioneer PR7820 was the first mass-produced, industrial LaserDisc player, sold originally as the MCA DiscoVision PR-7820. This unit was used in many GM dealerships as a source of training videos and presentation of GM's new line of cars and trucks in the late 1970s and early 1980s. After MCA DiscoVision shut down, Pioneer continued to sell the player under the Pioneer name as the Pioneer Model-III. The unit was a full Level-III player and could accept a data-dump from discs themselves. It could also be controlled by an external computer and could be gen-locked to external video sources.

The 7820 was the only player ever sold to either the industrial or consumer market that was entirely designed and engineered by the technicians at MCA Disco-Vision and contained all of their preferred design approaches, such as playing the disc with the laser on top (instead of underneath) and moving the disc radially to provide tracking instead of moving the laser radially. MCA engineers designed the player at the DiscoVision labs in Torrance, California and Universal-Pioneer mass-produced it in Japan. The 7820 was such a high quality player that MCA themselves used it at their DiscoVision disc pressing plant in Carson, California for quality control checks of both master discs and finished sets. Unfortunately, this caused problems because the 7820 could easily play discs that the poorly designed and quite primitive consumer player, the Magnavox VH-8000, simply could not cope with.

In 1980, Discovision Associates released a factory update, which could also be retrofitted to existing 7820s, that reduced disc search times to less than three seconds, and added the ability to jump up to 99 tracks during vertical blanking, giving essentially "instant" searches. An external computer interface box was also made available at the same time which contained additional memory that increased the total size of a disc-based computer program the 7820 could store and execute to 256k.

The 7820 was the first LD player to use solid-state tangential tracking: instead of a tangential tracking mirror, the 7820 used an electronic CCD delay line to provide tangential tracking corrections, giving the player superb color quality. It was not until 1985/6 that the tangential mirror began to be replaced by electronic correction, first by Yamaha in their first consumer LD player, and eventually, by Pioneer themselves.

MCA DiscoVision had no suggested retail price for the PR-7820; depending on the number purchased, it varied from $3,500 to $2,200 per unit if more than 1000 were bought at once. Fully functional 7820s are not easily available on eBay and are nearly impossible to find in fully functional condition. Because they have a steel chassis, weight is a shipping problem.

== Multiformat players ==
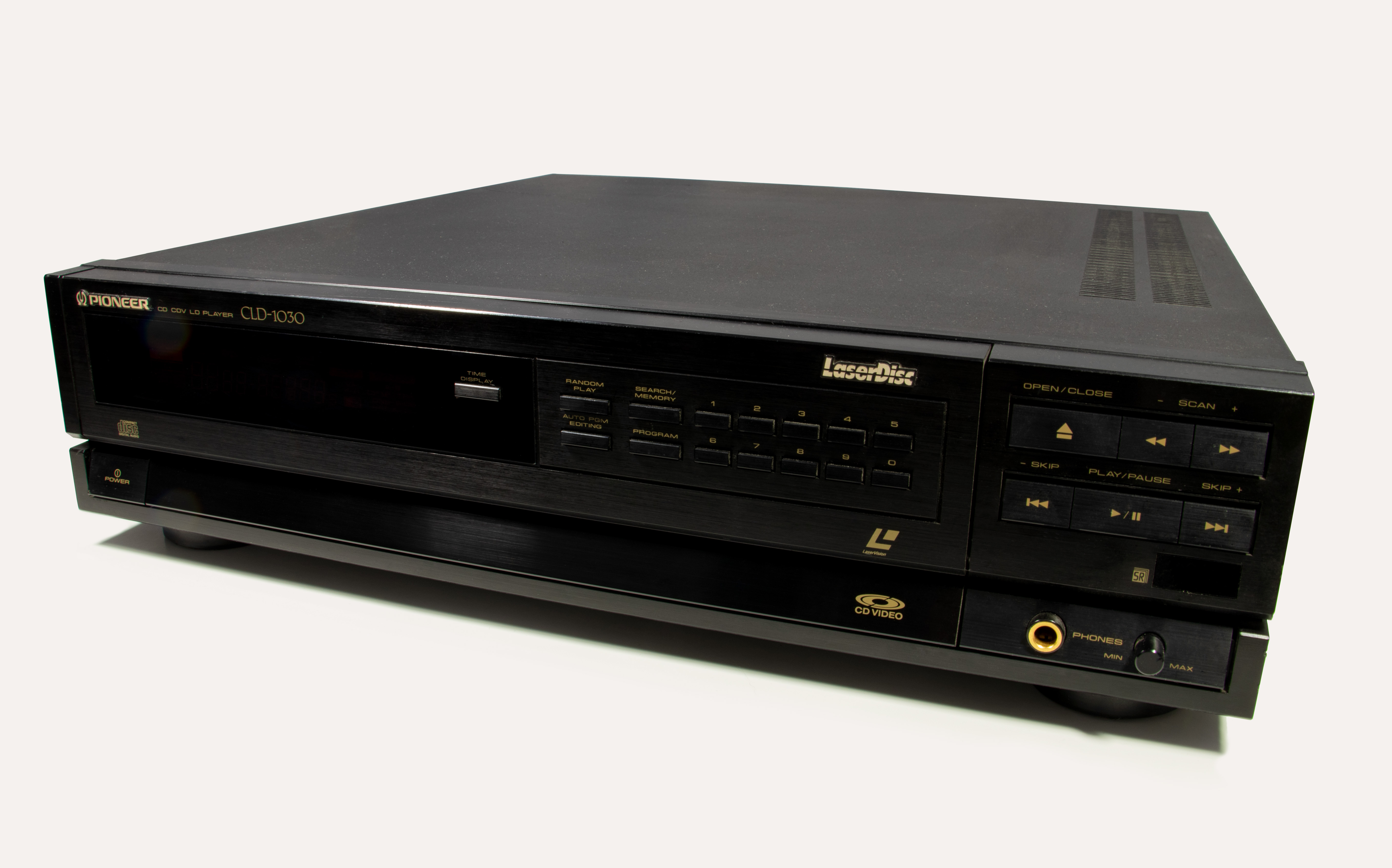
This Pioneer CLD-1030 unit is capable of playing both sizes of Laserdiscs, as well as Compact discs and CD Video discs. Later models added support for DVDs.

Most players made after the mid-1980s were capable of also playing audio CDs. These players included a 4.7 in (12 cm) indentation in the loading tray, where the CD would be placed for play. At least two Pioneer models (The CLD-M301 and the CLD-M90) also operated as a CD-changer, with several 4.7 in indentations around the circumference of the main tray.

In 1996, the first model DVD/LD combi-player (and first Pioneer DVD player, for that matter) was the Pioneer DVL-9 released in Japan. The Pioneer Elite DVL-90, an updated version, followed by a similar, though supposedly lower-end model, the DVL-700, were released in 1997. Successors to this model include the Pioneer DVL-909, Pioneer DVL-919, and the Pioneer Elite DVL-91. Although the DVD/LD combi players offered competent LD performance, they paled in comparison to high-end LD players such as the Pioneer Elite CLD-99 and the Pioneer Hi-Vision/MUSE HLD-X9.

The Pioneer DVL-909 lacks support for DTS output. However, a modification to the player can allow this player to support DTS streams on DTS discs, essentially turning the DVL-909 into a Pioneer Elite DVL-91.

The last model DVD/LD player was the Japanese only DVL-H9, but the older DVL-919 continued to be sold in the U.S. into the late 2000s as a niche product that was not actively marketed. The DVL-919 supports DTS output. The DVL-919's DVD section is unremarkable by modern standards, and does not support progressive scan (480p) even though it has component output. As noted above, the LD section, while competent, is inferior to earlier high-end LD players. A few Pioneer dealers offered North American specification DVL-919s, and a unit purchased in April 2004 had a manufacture date of December 2003. Manufacturing of the DVL-919 continued until January 1, 2009, when Pioneer announced that production would cease after a final production run of 3000 DVL-919 and other model laser disc players.

== High-end consumer models ==
Certain Japanese models of Pioneer players are considered by enthusiasts to be of higher quality or capable of higher-quality playback than North American models. These include the CLD-R7G, LD-S9, HLD-X9 and HLD-X0.

The LD-S9 and HLD-X9 share a very fine comb filter, allowing them to offer an advantage in picture quality over most other players when the S-Video connection is used. This filter is still used in Mitsubishi's high-end line of CRT rear-projection television sets (the Diamond and now-defunct Platinum series) and Pioneer's Elite line of rear-projection televisions.

In addition to the advanced comb filter, the HLD-X0 and HLD-X9 contain a red-laser pickup, which significantly reduces crosstalk and picture-noise levels compared to players with the traditional infrared laser; it can also read through all but the worst cases of laser rot and surface wear. The HLD-X0 and HLD-X9 were also MUSE players, capable when properly equipped of playing back high-definition video LaserDiscs, called Hi-Vision or MUSE discs in Japan.

=== High-definition (MUSE) ===
The HLD-1000 was Pioneer's first high-definition video player; it was one of a small number of models to employ multiple sub-Nyquist sampling encoding (MUSE) technology. It was followed by the HLD-X0, which by many enthusiasts is regarded as the best LaserDisc player ever made. The HLD-X0 was entirely hand-built and weighed 79 lb (36 kg). Although the X9 has auto-reverse, the X0 offers a picture with less noise and better color rendering than any other player.

== Other significant players ==
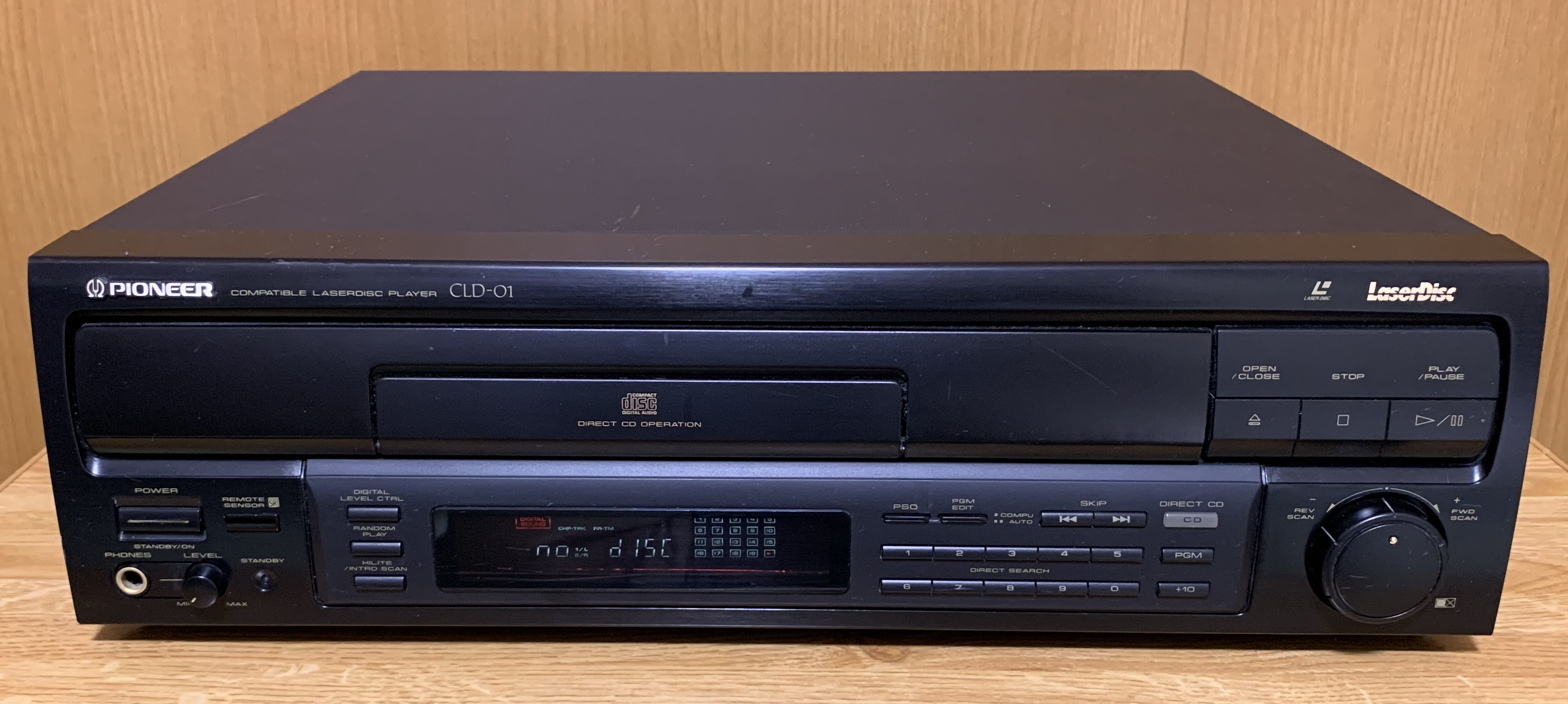
Pioneer CLD-01 (1992）

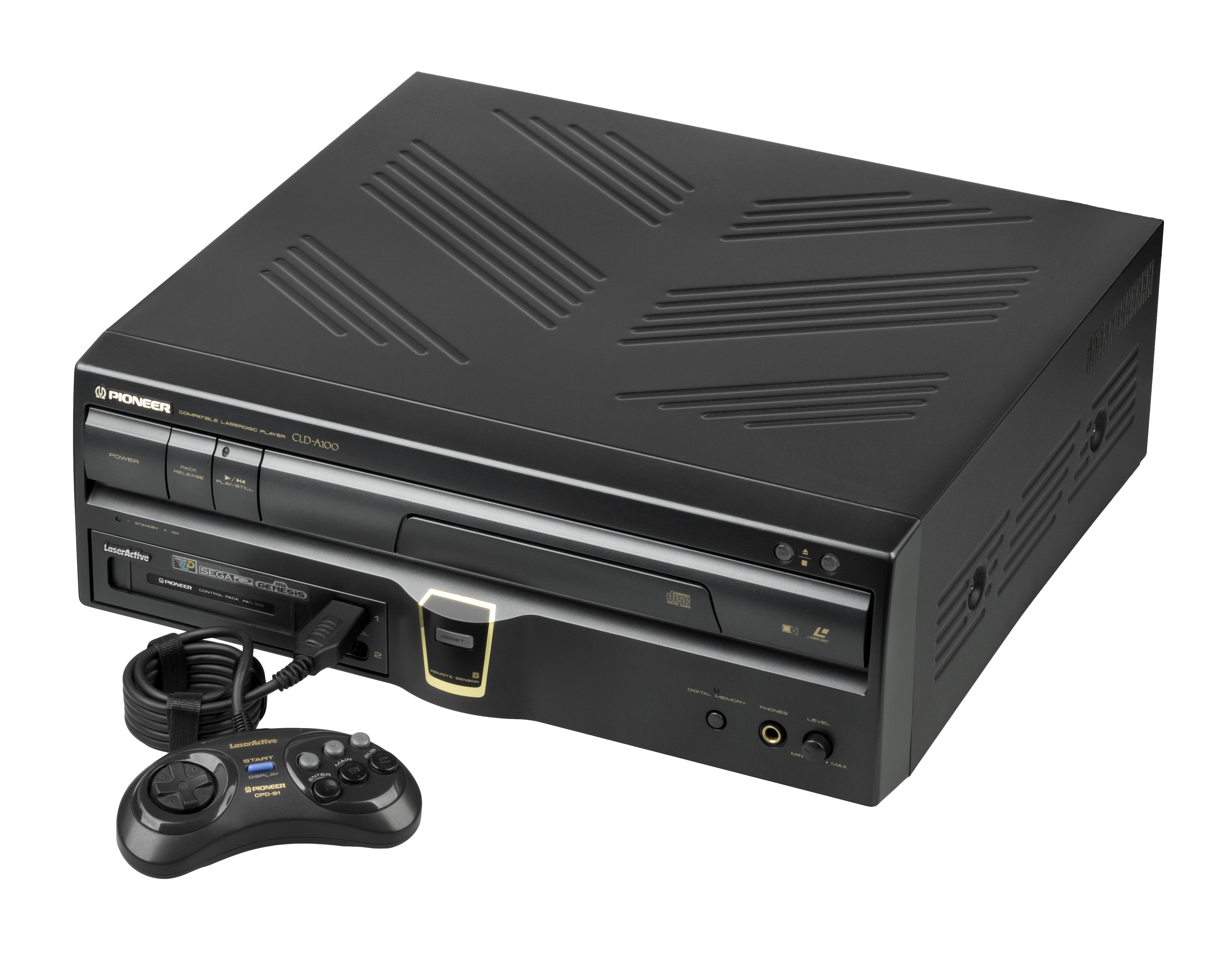
Pioneer LaserActive (1993)

Japanese

- Pioneer LD-1000, Pioneer's first Japanese-market LD player (released in 1981)
- Pioneer HLD-X0
- Pioneer HLD-X9
- Pioneer LaserActive (CLD-A100), a hybrid LaserDisc player and home video game console, that could play as Sega Genesis/Mega Drive or PC Engine/TurboGrafx-16 games using add-on packs
- Pioneer LD-S1, released in 1986
- Pioneer LD-X1, also called the Pioneer LD-S2 in North America
- Pioneer CLD-01, CD/LD Compatible Player (1992)

American

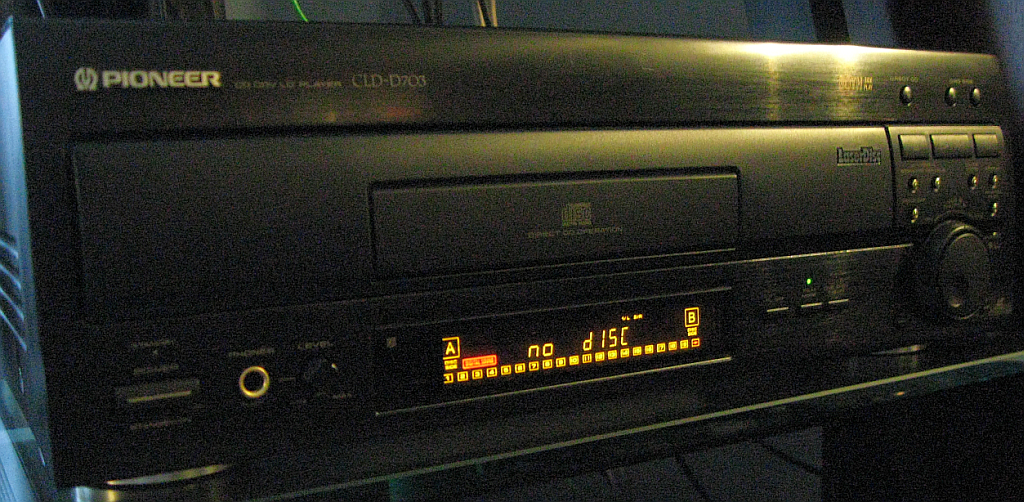
Pioneer CLD-D703 (1994)

- Pioneer VP-1000, Pioneer's first consumer player for North America (released in 1980)
- Pioneer LD-1100, Pioneer's first North American player to have built-in CX Noise Reduction (released in late 1981)
- Pioneer CLD-1010, first player capable of playing 5-inch (130 mm) CD-Video discs (released in 1987)
- Pioneer CLD-D703
- Pioneer CLD-97
- Pioneer CLD-99

European

- Pioneer CLD-1050, PAL only
- Pioneer CLD-2950, PAL- and NTSC-compatible.
- Pioneer CLD-D925, PAL- and NTSC-compatible.
- Pioneer DVL series, capable of playing both LaserDiscs and DVDs

== See also ==
- DVD player
- VCR/Blu-ray combo
- VCR/DVD combo
- Videocassette recorder
