= DVL =

DVL could refer to:

- Differential Vascular Labeling, method to differentiate between blood and lymphatic systems
- Doppler Velocity Log, an instrument used to measure velocities in water
- Damn Vulnerable Linux, a Linux distribution designed for IT-Security training.
- Phoenix Deer Valley Airport by IATA-code
- Davitamon–Lotto, former name of the Belgian cycling team Omega Pharma–Lotto
- Dearne Valley Line, a railway line in England
- Desert Valley League, a high school sports league in Riverside County, California, United States
- Deutsche Versuchsanstalt für Luftfahrt, a German aerospace center
- Deutsche Volksliste, a former Nazi institution
- Deutsche Volleyball-Bundesliga, the German Volleyball-league
- Devils Lake (Amtrak station), North Dakota, United States; Amtrak station code DVL
- Devils Lake Regional Airport, North Dakota, United States; IATA airport code DVL
- Devlali railway station, India; Indian Railways station code DVL
- Digital Video Logger see Digital video recorder
- Discrete Video Learning
- Dishevelled, a gene family (DVL1, DVL2, and DVL3) that regulates the Wnt signaling pathway and other intercellular signaling pathways
- Dries Van Langendonck, a Belgian racing driver
- Pioneer DVL, a series of hybrid DVD/LaserDisc players
