= Optical recording =

History of optical recording

The history of optical recording can be divided into a few number of distinct major contributions. The pioneers of optical recording worked mostly independently, and their solutions to the many technical challenges have very distinctive features, such as

- reflective disc (Compaan and Kramer)
- transparent disc (Gregg)
- floppy disc (Russell)
- rigid disc (Compaan and Kramer)
- focused laser beam for read-out through transparent substrate (Compaan and Kramer).

== Gregg 1958 ==
Laserdisc technology, using a transparent disc, was invented by David Paul Gregg in 1958 (and patented in 1970 and 1990). By 1969 Philips had developed a videodisc in reflective mode, which has great advantages over the transparent mode. MCA and Philips decided to join their efforts. They first publicly demonstrated the videodisc in 1972. Laserdisc was first available on the market, in Atlanta, on December 15, 1978, two years after the VHS VCR and four years before the CD, which is based on Laserdisc technology. Philips produced the players and MCA produced the discs. The Philips/MCA cooperation was not successful, and discontinued after a few years. Several of the scientists responsible for the early research (John Winslow, Richard Wilkinson and Ray Dakin) founded Optical Disc Corporation (now ODC Nimbus).

== Russell 1965 ==
While working at Pacific Northwest National Laboratory, James Russell invented an optical storage system for digital audio and video, patenting the concept in 1970.

The earliest patents by Russell, US 3,501,586, and 3,795,902 were filed in 1966, and 1969. respectively. He built prototypes, and the first was operating in 1973.

Russell had found a way to record digital information onto a photosensitive plate in tiny dark spots, each spot one micrometre from centre to centre, with a laser that wrote the binary patterns. Russell's first optical disc was distinctly different from the eventual compact disc product: the disc in the player was not read by laser light. A key characteristic of Russell's invention is that a laser is not used for the reading the disc, instead the entire disc or oblong sheet to be read is illuminated by a large playback light source at the back of the transparent foil. As a result, the information density is relatively low.

By 1985, Russell held over 25 patents to various technologies related to optical recording and playback. Russell's intellectual property was purchased by Optical Recording Corporation (ORC) in Toronto in 1985, and this firm notified a number of CD manufacturers that their CD technology was based on patents held by ORC. In 1987, ORC signed an agreement with Sony whereby Sony paid for licensing of the technology. Further licenses followed from Philips and others. Warner Communications did not sign, and was sued by ORC. In 1992, the large CD manufacturer, now called Time Warner, was ordered to pay ORC US$30 million in patent violations.

In the 1970 patent, the spot diameter was around 10 micrometres. Thus, the areal information density was around a factor hundred less than that of the CD as later developed. Russell continued to refine the concept throughout the 1970s. Philips and Sony, however, were able to put far greater resources into the parallel development of the concept, arriving at a smaller and more sophisticated product in just a few years. Russell's various partners and ventures failed to produce a single consumer product.

== Korpel 1968 ==
Adrianus Korpel worked for the Zenith Electronics Corporation, when he developed very early optical videodisc systems, including holographic storage.

== Kramer and Compaan 1969 ==
The Philips development of the videodisc technology began in 1969 with efforts by Dutch physicists Klaas Compaan and Piet Kramer to record video images in holographic form on disc. Their prototype Laserdisc shown in 1972 used a laser beam in reflective mode to read a track of pits using an FM video signal. Together with MCA, Philips brought the optical videodisk to market in 1978. The cooperation between Philips and MCA did not last long, and discontinued after a few years.

== Immink and Doi 1979 ==
The Compact Disc (CD), which is based on MCA/Philips Laserdisc technology, was developed by a taskforce of Sony and Philips in 1979–1980. Toshi Doi and Kees Schouhamer Immink created the digital technologies that turned the analog Laserdisc into a high-density low-cost digital audio disc. The CD, available on the market since October 1982, remains the standard physical medium for sale of commercial audio recordings

Standard CDs have a diameter of 120 mm and can hold up to 80 minutes of audio (700 MB of data). The Mini CD has various diameters ranging from 60 to 80 mm; they are sometimes used for CD singles or device drivers, storing up to 24 minutes of audio. The technology was later adapted and expanded to include data storage CD-ROM, write-once audio and data storage CD-R, rewritable media CD-RW, Super Audio CD (SACD), Video Compact Discs (VCD), Super Video Compact Discs (SVCD), PhotoCD, PictureCD, CD-i, and Enhanced CD. CD-ROMs and CD-Rs remain widely used technologies in the computer industry. The CD and its extensions have been extremely successful: in 2004, worldwide sales of CD audio, CD-ROM, and CD-R reached about 30 billion discs. By 2007, 200 billion CDs had been sold worldwide.

== See also ==
- Computer data storage
- Digital recording
- Digital signal (signal processing)
- Optical disc
