= Video Single Disc =

LaserDisc the size of a Compact Disc

Video Single Disc (VSD)
- Media type: Optical disc
- Encoding: NTSC
- Capacity: Up to 800 MB
- Read mechanism: 780 nm wavelength semiconductor laser
- Developed by: Sony
- Dimensions: Diameter 120 mm (4 3/4 in); Thickness 1.2 mm (1/21 inch)
- Usage: Home video, video storage
- Extended from: LaserDisc, CDV
- Extended to: Video CD
- Released: 1990

Video Single Disc (VSD) is a disc-based format that carried the same analog video information as a LaserDisc, but on a 12-centimetre (4.75 inch) diameter CD-sized disc. It was spearheaded by Sony and was released in Japan in 1990. It was a new variety of laserdisc and variation on the CD Video (CD-V) format, except that VSD disc carried only a video track (of up to 5 minutes' duration), and its associated audio, with no CD-compatible partition. The disc is the same size as a standard CD and holds five minutes of video with digital sound. It did not have any additional audio tracks like CD-V. Like CD-V, VSD discs could be played back by multi-disc or LaserDisc players that had VSD playback capability.

== Release ==
Upon release, the Video Single Disc was seen as a possible replacement for the failing “CD Video” format, which had confused the public with its combination of five minutes of video and 20 minutes of audio.

=== Cost ===
In Japan the Video Single Disc (VSD) was listed at around US$8 which was half the price of the (US$16) CD Video.

=== Popularity ===
VSDs were popular only in Japan and other parts of Asia, and was never marketed or introduced elsewhere in the world, but the format did get used once in the United States for a promotional movie teaser and trailer disc to accompany early pressings of the Terminator 2: Judgment Day movie when it was released on LaserDisc in 1991.

== See also ==
- CD Video
- Video CD
