= LaserDisc =

Optical analog video disc format

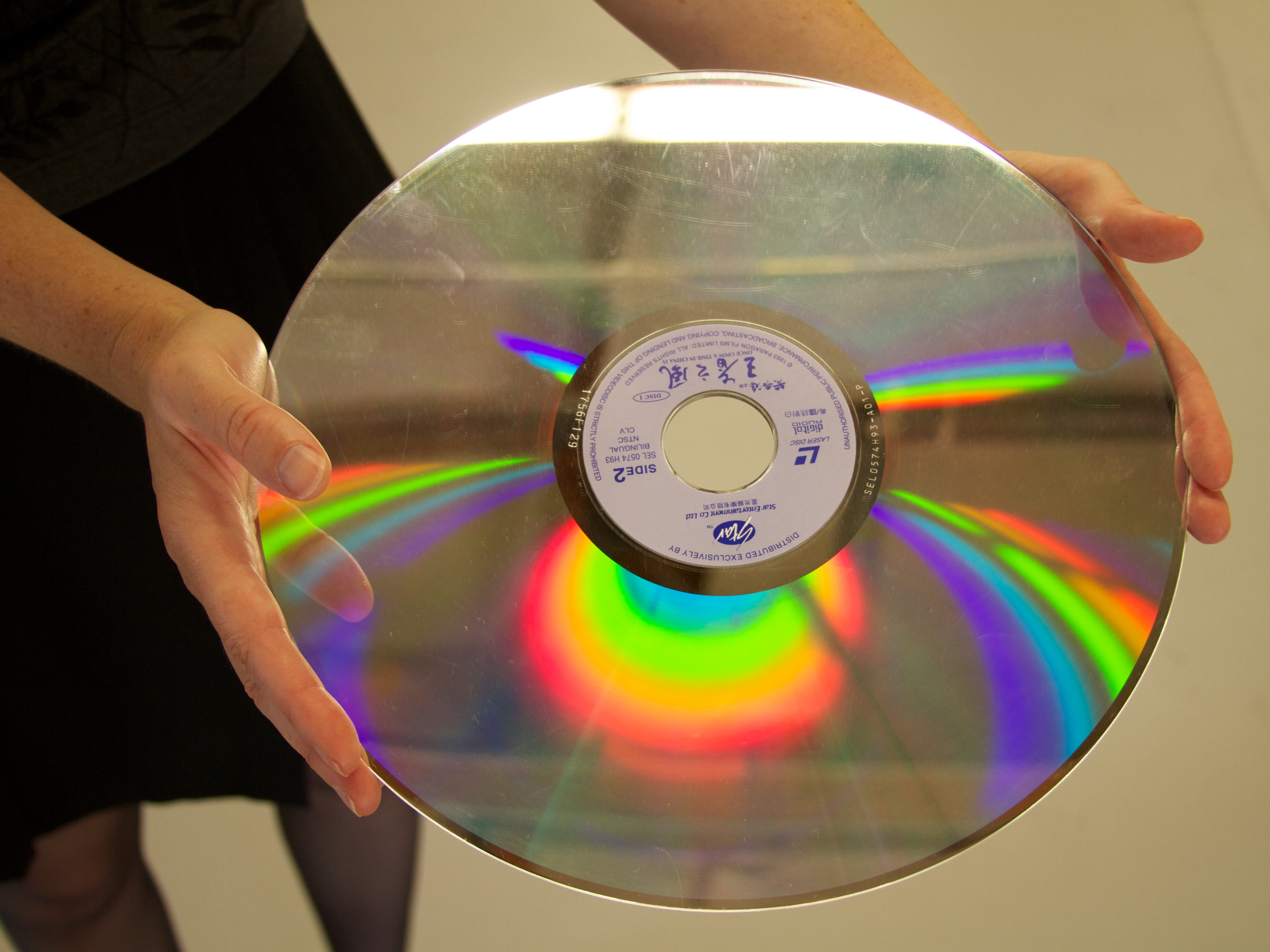
- A LaserDisc being held in 2013
- Media type: Optical disc
- Encoding: NTSC, PAL, MUSE, HD‑MAC, PALplus
- Capacity: 60/64 minutes on CLV; 30/36 minutes on CAV; (NTSC/PAL, per side)
- Read mechanism: 780 nm laser diode (early players used He‍–‍Ne laser)
- Standard: LaserVision
- Developed by: MCA; Philips; Pioneer
- Dimensions: Common: 300 mm (11.8 in); Less common: 200 mm (7.9 in), 120 mm (4.7 in)
- Usage: Home video
- Extended to: CD; DVD; LV-ROM
- Released: December 11, 1978 (as DiscoVision); 1980 (as LaserDisc)
- Discontinued: September 21, 2001 (films); July 2009 (production)

LaserDisc (LD) is a home video format and the first commercial optical disc storage medium. It was developed by Philips, Pioneer, and the movie studio MCA. The format was initially marketed in the United States in 1978 under the name DiscoVision, a brand used by MCA. As Pioneer took a greater role in its development and promotion, the format was rebranded LaserVision (LV). While the LaserDisc brand originally referred specifically to Pioneer's line of players, the term gradually came to be used generically to refer to the format as a whole, making it a genericized trademark. The discs typically have a diameter of 300 millimeters (11.8 in), similar in size to the 12-inch (305 mm) phonograph record. Unlike most later optical disc formats, LaserDisc is not fully digital; it stores an analog video signal.

Many titles featured CD-quality digital audio, and LaserDisc was the first home video format to support surround sound. Its resolution of 425 to 440 TV lines was nearly double that of competing consumer videotape formats, VHS and Betamax, and approaching the resolution later achieved by DVDs. Despite these advantages, the format failed to achieve widespread adoption in North America or Europe, primarily due to the high cost of players and their inability to record.

In contrast, LaserDisc was significantly more popular in Japan and in wealthier regions of Southeast Asia, including Singapore and Malaysia, and it became the dominant rental video format in Hong Kong during the 1990s. Its superior audiovisual quality made it a favorite among videophiles and film enthusiasts throughout its lifespan.

The technologies and concepts developed for LaserDisc laid the groundwork for subsequent optical media formats, including the compact disc (CD) and DVD. LaserDisc player production ended in July 2009 with Pioneer's exit from the market.

== History ==
The origins of optical recording date back to 1963, when David Paul Gregg and James Russell developed a transparent disc-based system, later patented in 1970. MCA acquired the rights to this technology in 1968. Separately, by 1969, Philips had developed a videodisc using reflective technology, which offered advantages over the transparent method. MCA and Philips began collaborating in the early 1970s and publicly demonstrated the videodisc format in 1972. Internally, the technology was known by several names, including Optical Videodisc System, Reflective Optical Videodisc, Laser Optical Videodisc, and Video Long Play.

The format was commercially introduced as MCA DiscoVision on December 11, 1978, in a test market launch in Atlanta, Georgia, two years after the debut of VHS and four years before the introduction of the CD, which is based on laser disc technology. The first LaserDisc title released in North America was the MCA DiscoVision edition of Jaws on December 15, 1978. Philips produced the players, while MCA manufactured the discs; however, the partnership ultimately proved unsuccessful and was dissolved after several years.

In 1980, Pioneer acquired a majority stake in the format and began marketing it as both LaserVision (as the format name) and LaserDisc (as the brand). Some releases informally referred to it as Laser Videodisc. Pioneer's LaserDisc players debuted in Japan in October 1981.

By 1984, Philips and Sony had introduced LV-ROM, a version of the format designed to store digital data, offering a capacity of 3.28 GB, foreshadowing the capabilities of later formats such as CD-ROM or DVD-ROM.

Although LaserDisc never achieved mass-market success, the format gained modest popularity in select markets and developed a niche following. In Japan, market penetration reached approximately 10% of households by 1999. In the United States, about 2% of households (roughly two million) owned a player. As of 2021, LaserDisc retains a small collector community in the United States and Japan. In Europe, the format remained obscure, though it saw limited institutional use. Notably, the British Broadcasting Corporation (BBC) employed LaserDisc for the BBC Domesday Project in the mid-1980s, and from the early 1990s through the late 1990s, also used Sony's CRVdisc variant to broadcast television idents.

LaserDisc was largely supplanted by the DVD format by the early 2000s. The last LaserDisc title released in North America was Paramount's Bringing Out the Dead on October 3, 2000. In Japan, new titles continued to be released until September 21, 2001, with the final film being the Hong Kong action movie Tokyo Raiders from Golden Harvest. The last known LaserDisc release of any kind was Onta Station vol. 1018, a karaoke title issued exclusively in Japan on March 21, 2007.

Pioneer ceased production of LaserDisc players in July 2009. The company continued to offer maintenance services until September 30, 2020, when the remaining parts inventory was exhausted. A total of 16.8 million LaserDisc players were sold worldwide, including 9.5 million units sold by Pioneer.

== Design ==
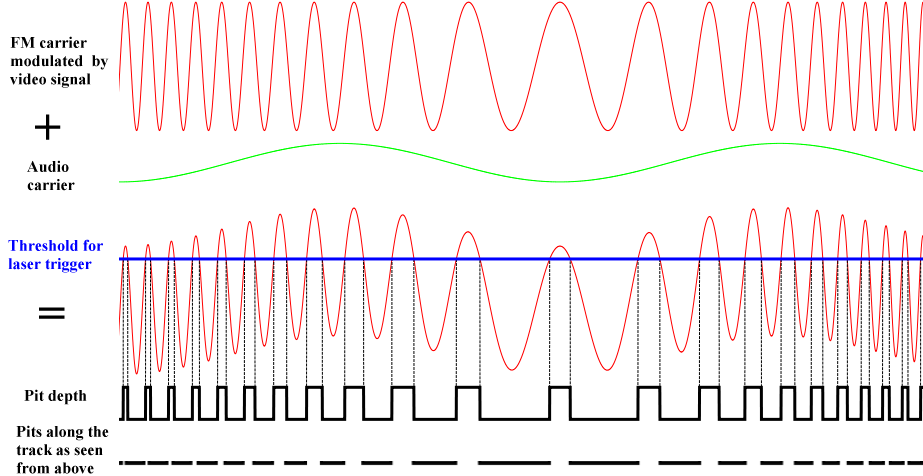
Illustration of how video and audio are transformed into a sequence of variable length pits along the track of a LaserDisc

A standard LaserDisc used for home video was 300 millimeters (11.8 in) in diameter, roughly the same size as a 12-inch (305 mm) phonograph record. At a basic level, LaserDiscs used a series of tiny pits and flat areas (called lands) etched into the disc surface. These core technologies would later be reused in CDs and DVDs. As a result, all three formats appear similar in physical design. However, LaserDisc differed significantly in how it stored information.

LaserDiscs stored analog video using a composite signal format, offering picture quality comparable to the 1-inch (25 mm) Type C videotape format, with a resolution of 425 to 440 TV lines . A carrier frequency was modulated by the video signal, and this signal was physically represented by the pattern of pits and lands on the disc. During playback, a laser read these patterns, enabling the player's circuitry to reconstruct the original analog signal.

Audio was originally recorded as analog stereo using frequency modulation. Later discs introduced digital audio using pulse-code modulation (PCM), and by the 1990s, some titles supported digital surround sound formats such as Dolby Digital and DTS. These digital tracks were typically output through optical (TOSLINK) or coaxial (S/PDIF) connections to an external digital-to-analog converter. Digital PCM audio was encoded by directly summing its baseband signal with the FM-modulated video and analog audio carriers. This combined signal was then clipped, creating a square wave whose transitions are recorded as the pattern of pits and lands on the disc. The frequency of these transitions represented the high-frequency video information. Meanwhile, the lower-frequency digital and analog audio signals caused variations in the signal's duty cycle, which can be visualized as relative changes in pit length.

Because digital compression techniques were not yet available or practical in the late 1970s, three different playback formats were developed based on the disc's rotation speed:

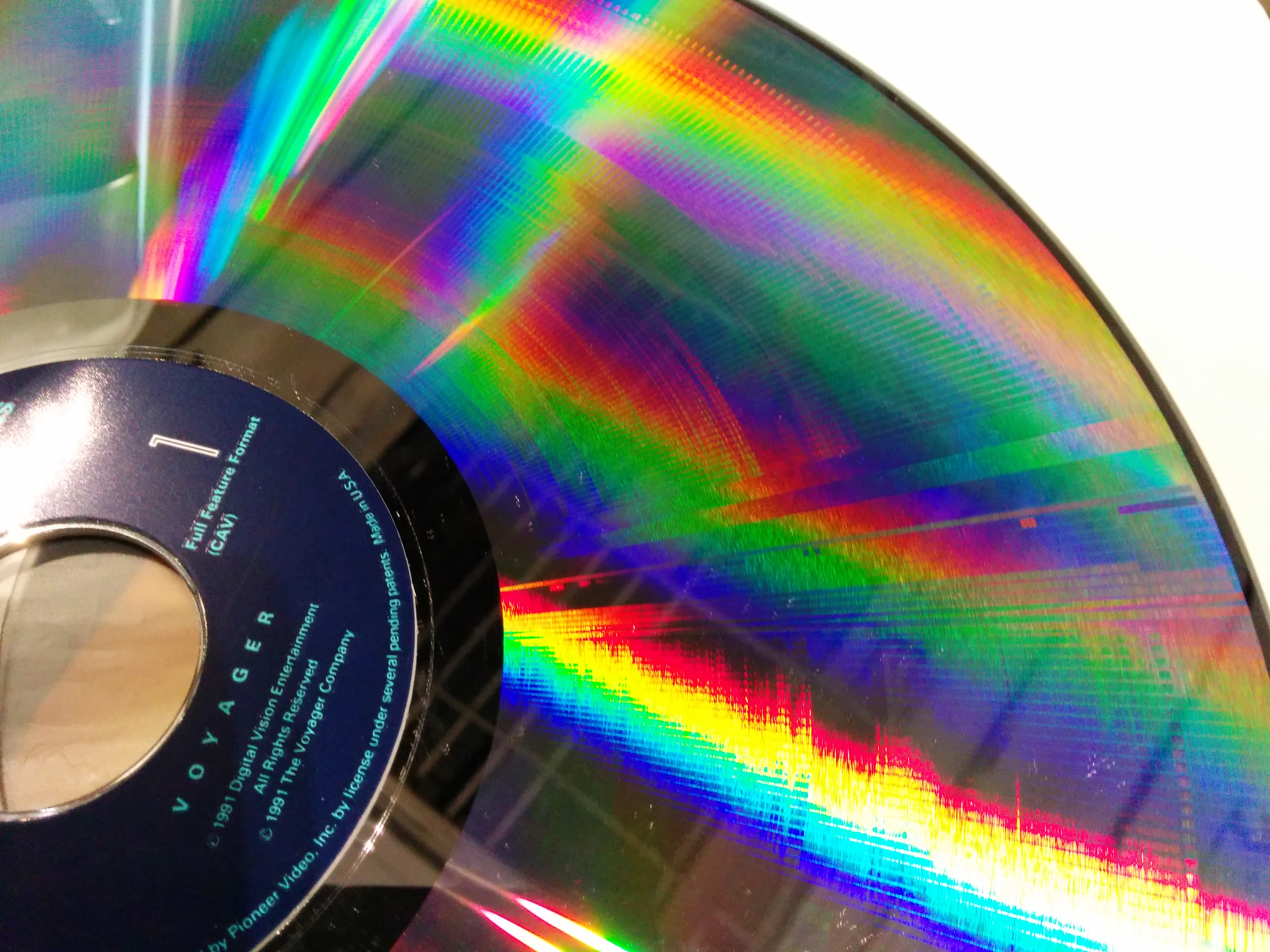
Constant angular velocity (CAV) LaserDisc showing the NTSC field setup and individual scanlines. Each rotation has two such regions.

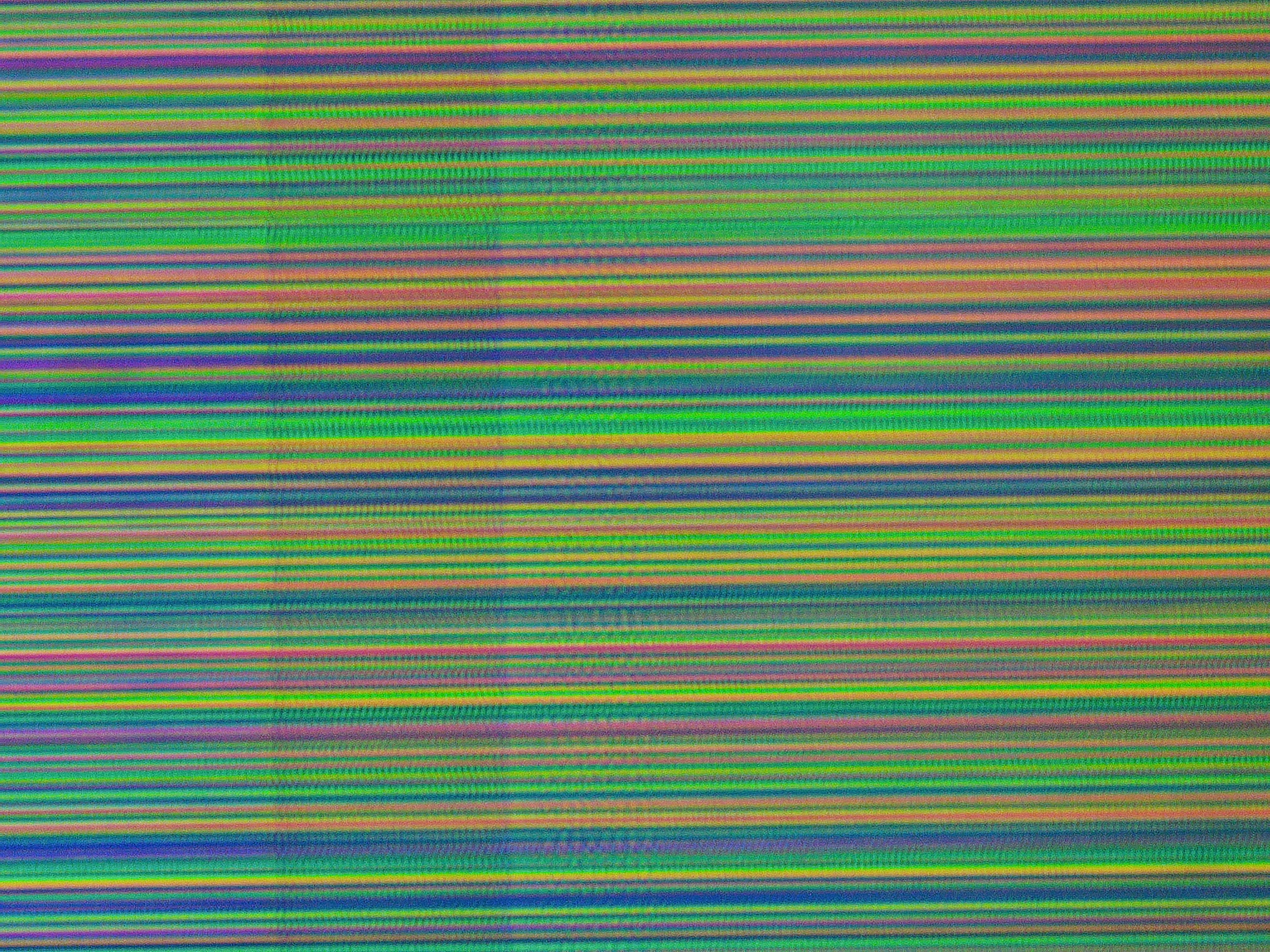
200× light micrograph of the NTSC field setup and individual scanlines of a CAV LaserDisc. From left to right: the end of one horizontal line, the horizontal sync pulse, the NTSC color burst, and the luminance for the rest of the line.

CAV
Constant angular velocity (CAV), also known as Standard Play, offered several advanced playback features, including freeze-frame, variable slow motion, and reverse playback. CAV discs were played at a constant rotational speed, 1,800 rpm for NTSC or Hi-Vision and 1,500 rpm for PAL, with one video frame read per revolution. This allowed for 54,000 individual frames to be stored on a single side, equating to 30 minutes of video for NTSC and Hi-Vision, or 36 minutes for PAL. A key advantage of CAV was reduced visibility of crosstalk between adjacent tracks, as any interference would occur at the same point in adjacent frames. Although less common than constant linear velocity (CLV) discs, CAV was often used for special edition releases to showcase bonus features and effects. Notably, each frame on a CAV disc could be referenced by number, a feature valued by film scholars and enthusiasts for studying continuity, staging, and production details.

Comparison of several forms of disc storage showing tracks (not to scale); green denotes start and red denotes end. Some CD-R(W) and DVD-R(W)/DVD+R(W) recorders operate in ZCLV, CAA or CAV modes.

CLV
Constant linear velocity (CLV), also known as Extended Play, did not support the advanced playback features of CAV discs, except when used with high-end LaserDisc players equipped with a digital frame store, which could simulate functions like freeze-frame and variable-speed playback. CLV discs gradually slowed their rotational speed during playback to increase storage capacity, ranging from 1,800 to 600 rpm for NTSC, and 2,470 to 935 rpm for Hi-Vision. This allowed up to 60 minutes of video per side for NTSC and Hi-Vision formats (64 minutes for PAL), or up to two hours per disc. For films under two hours, the entire feature could fit on a single disc, which reduced production costs and removed the need to change discs mid-movie, especially convenient for users with dual-sided players. Most LaserDisc titles were released in CLV format, though some used a mix, with one side in CLV and the other in CAV. This allowed selected scenes, such as the climax or bonus features, to be presented in CAV, enabling frame-accurate navigation and highlighting special effects.
CAA
Constant angular acceleration (CAA) was introduced in the early 1980s to address crosstalk distortion and tracking issues found in CLV discs. Unlike CLV, which slows the disc gradually, CAA changes the rotation speed in controlled steps, improving playback while remaining compatible with existing players. Most disc manufacturers switched to CAA, though the term rarely appeared on consumer packaging. When digital audio was added to LaserDisc in 1985, it created bandwidth issues with CAA, reducing playback time to 55 minutes per side. As a result, some movies included only analog audio to fit the entire film on one disc. By 1987, Pioneer improved the CAA format to support a full 60 minutes of video with digital audio. Pioneer also extended CAA disc playback to 65 minutes per side for a few titles and developed a 70-minute format, though this longer version was never used commercially.

=== Audio ===
Sound could be stored in either analog or digital format and in a variety of surround sound formats; NTSC discs could carry a stereo analog audio track, plus a stereo CD-quality uncompressed PCM digital audio track, which were (EFM, CIRC, 16-bit and 44.1 kHz sample rate). PAL discs could carry one pair of audio tracks, either analog or digital and the digital tracks on a PAL disc were 16-bit, 44.1 kHz as on a CD; in the UK, the term "LaserVision" is used to refer to discs with analog sound, while "LaserDisc" is used for those with digital audio. The digital sound signal in both formats is EFM-encoded, as in CD.

Dolby Digital (also called AC-3) and DTS, which are now common on DVD releases, first became available on LaserDisc, and Star Wars: Episode I – The Phantom Menace (1999) which was released on LaserDisc in Japan, was among the first home video releases ever to include 6.1 channel Dolby Digital EX Surround (along with a few other late-life releases from 1999 to 2001). Unlike DVDs, which carry Dolby Digital audio in digital form, LaserDiscs stored Dolby Digital in a frequency modulated form within a track normally used for analog audio. Extracting Dolby Digital from a LaserDisc required a player equipped with a special "AC-3 RF" output and an external demodulator in addition to an AC-3 decoder. The demodulator was necessary to convert the 2.88 MHz modulated AC-3 information on the disc into a 384 kbit/s signal that the decoder could handle.

In the mid to late 1990s, many higher-end AV receivers included the demodulator circuit specifically for the LaserDisc player's RF-modulated Dolby Digital AC-3 signal. By the late 1990s, with LaserDisc players and disc sales declining due to DVD's growing popularity, the AV receiver manufacturers removed the demodulator circuit. Although DVD players were capable of playing Dolby Digital tracks, the signals out of DVD players were not in a modulated form and were not compatible with the inputs designed for LaserDisc AC-3. Outboard demodulators were available for a period that converted the AC-3 signal to the standard Dolby Digital signal that was compatible with the standard Dolby Digital/PCM inputs on capable AV receivers. Another type marketed by Onkyo and Marantz converted the RF AC-3 signal to 6-channel analog audio.

At least where the digital audio tracks were concerned, the sound quality was unsurpassed at the time compared to consumer videotape. However, the quality of the analog soundtracks could vary greatly depending upon the disc and, sometimes, the player. Many early and lower-end LaserDisc players had poor analog audio components, and in turn, many early discs had poorly mastered analog audio tracks, making digital soundtracks in any form more desirable to serious enthusiasts. Early DiscoVision and LaserDisc titles lacked the digital audio option, but many of those movies received digital sound in later re-issues by Universal, and the quality of analog audio tracks generally improved greatly as time went on. Many discs that had originally carried old analog stereo tracks received new Dolby Stereo and Dolby Surround tracks instead often in addition to digital tracks, which helped boost sound quality. Later analog discs also applied CX noise reduction, which improved the signal-to-noise ratio of the audio.

DTS audio, when available on a disc, replaced the digital audio tracks; hearing DTS-encoded audio required only an S/PDIF compliant digital connection to a DTS decoder.

On a DTS disc, digital PCM audio was not available, so if a DTS decoder was also not available, the only option was to fall back to the analog Dolby Surround or stereo audio tracks. In some cases, the analog audio tracks were further made unavailable through replacement with supplementary audio such as isolated scores or audio commentary. This effectively reduced playback of a DTS disc on a non-DTS equipped system to mono audio, or in a handful of cases, no film soundtrack at all.

Only one 5.1 surround sound option existed on a given LaserDisc (either Dolby Digital or DTS). As such, if surround sound was desired, the disc must be matched to the capabilities of the playback equipment (LaserDisc player and receiver/decoder) by the purchaser. A fully capable LaserDisc playback system included a newer LaserDisc player that was capable of playing digital tracks; had a digital optical output for digital PCM and DTS encoded audio; was aware of AC-3 audio tracks; and had an AC-3 coaxial output, an external or internal AC-3 RF demodulator and AC-3 decoder, and a DTS decoder. Many 1990s A/V receivers combined the AC-3 decoder and DTS decoder logic, but an integrated AC-3 demodulator was rare both in LaserDisc players and in later A/V receivers.

PAL LaserDiscs have a slightly longer playing time than NTSC discs, but have fewer audio options. PAL discs only have two audio tracks, consisting of either two analog-only tracks on older PAL LaserDiscs, or two digital-only tracks on newer discs. In comparison, later NTSC LaserDiscs are capable of carrying four tracks (two analog and two digital). On certain releases, one of the analog tracks is used to carry a modulated AC-3 signal for 5.1 channel audio (for decoding and playback by newer LaserDisc players with an "AC-3 RF" output). Older NTSC LaserDiscs made before 1984 (such as the original DiscoVision discs) only have two analog audio tracks.

== LaserDisc players ==
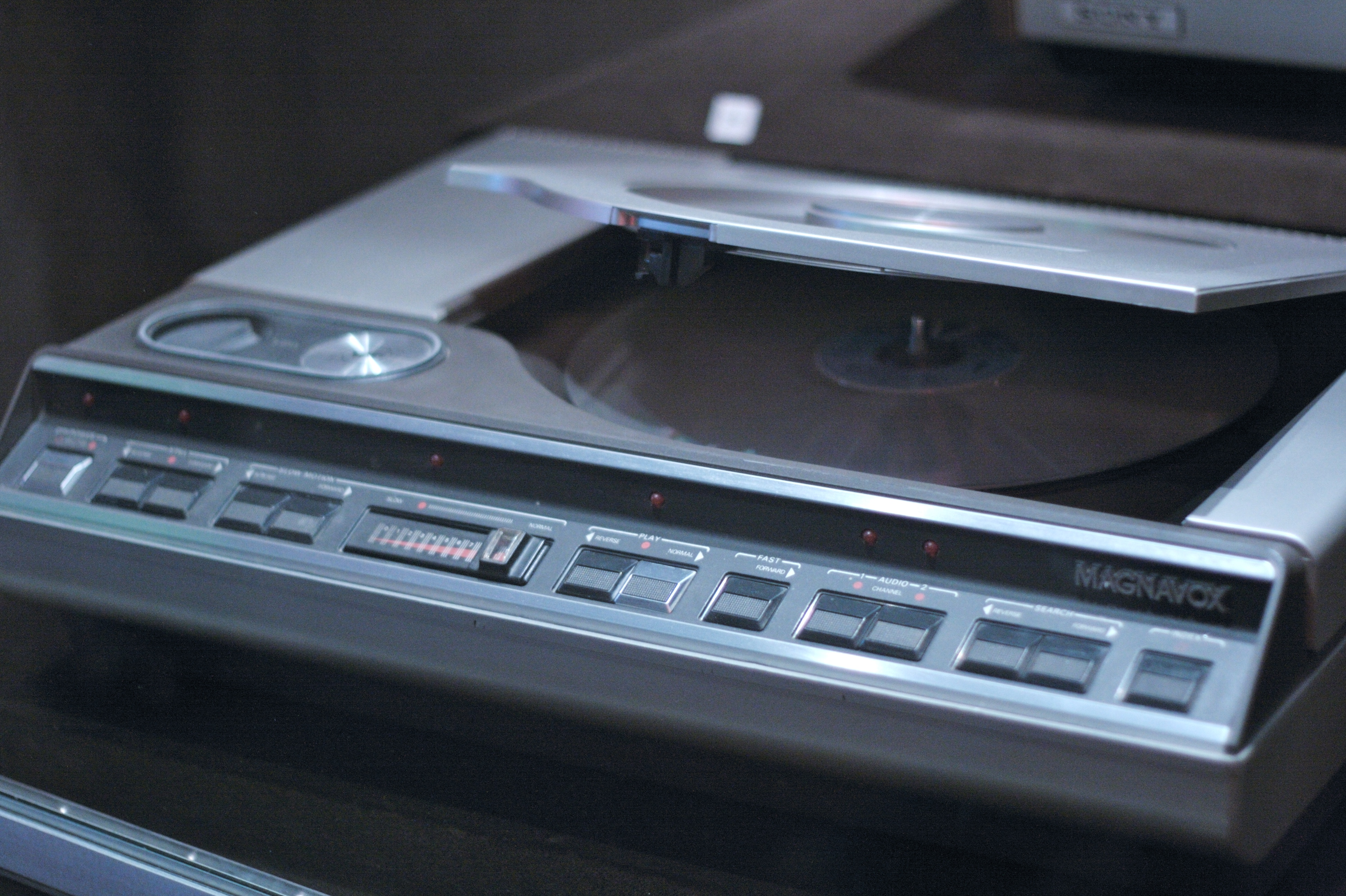
A top-loading, Magnavox-brand LaserDisc player with the lid open

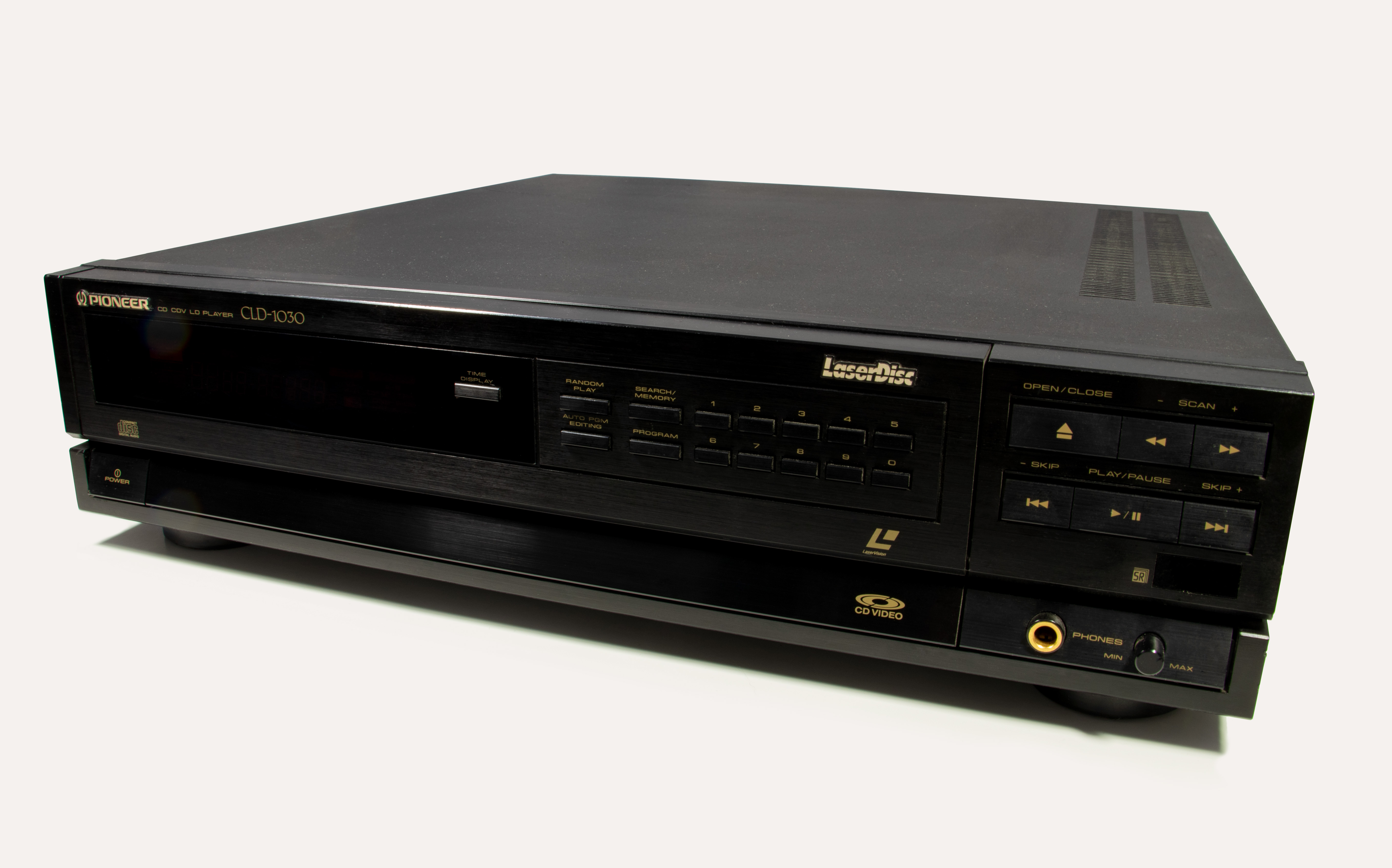
A front-loading, Pioneer CLD-1030 CD/CDV/LD player

The earliest players employed gas helium–neon laser tubes to read discs and had a red-orange light with a wavelength of 632.8 nm, while later solid-state players used infrared semiconductor laser diodes with a wavelength of 780 nm.

In March 1984, Pioneer introduced the first consumer player with a solid-state laser, the LD-700. It was also the first LaserDisc player to load from the front and not the top. One year earlier, Hitachi introduced an expensive industrial player with a laser diode, but the player had poor picture quality (due to an inadequate dropout compensator), and was made only in limited quantities. After Pioneer released the LD-700, gas lasers were no longer used in consumer players, despite their advantages, although Philips continued to use gas lasers in their industrial units until 1985.

Most LaserDisc players required the user to manually turn the disc over to play the other side. A number of players (all diode laser based) were made that were capable of playing both sides of the disc automatically, using a mechanism to physically flip a single laser pickup.

Pioneer produced some multi-disc models which held more than 50 LaserDiscs. For a short time in 1984, one company offered a "LaserStack" unit that added multi-disc capability to existing players: the Pioneer LD-600, LD-1100, or the Sylvania/Magnavox clones. It required the user to physically remove the player lid for installation, where it then attached to the top of the player. LaserStack held up to 10 discs and could automatically load or remove them from the player or change sides in around 15 seconds.

The first mass-produced industrial LaserDisc player was the MCA DiscoVision PR-7820, later rebranded the Pioneer PR7820. In North America, this unit was used in many General Motors dealerships as a source of training videos and presentation of GM's new line of cars and trucks in the late 1970s and early 1980s.

Most players made after the mid-1980s were capable of also playing Compact Discs. These players included a 4.7 in (12 cm) indentation in the loading tray, where the CD was placed for playback. At least two Pioneer models (the CLD-M301 and the CLD-M90) also operated as a CD changer, with several 4.7 in indentations around the circumference of the main tray.

The Pioneer DVL-9, introduced in 1996, was both Pioneer's first consumer DVD player and the first combination DVD/LD player.

The first high-definition video player was the Pioneer HLD-X0. A later model, the HLD-X9, featured a superior comb filter, and laser diodes on both sides of the disc.

=== Notable players ===
- Pioneer PR7820, first industrial LaserDisc player, capable of being controlled by an external computer.
- Pioneer CLD-900, first combination player capable of reading Compact Discs. Released in 1985.
- Pioneer CLD-1010, first player capable of playing 5-inch (130 mm) CD-Video discs. Released in 1987.
- Pioneer LaserActive players: The Pioneer CLD-A100 and NEC PCE-LD1 provided the ability to play Sega Genesis (Mega Drive) and TurboGrafx16 (PC Engine) video games when used in conjunction with additional components.
- Pioneer DVL series, capable of playing both LaserDiscs and DVDs

== Branding ==
LaserVision / LaserDisc certification mark.

During its development, MCA (which co-owned the technology), referred to it as the Optical Videodisc System, "Reflective Optical Videodisc" or "Laser Optical Videodisc", depending on the document. They changed the name once in 1969 to Disco-Vision and then again in 1978 to DiscoVision (without the hyphen), which became the official spelling. Technical documents and brochures produced by MCA Disco-Vision during the early and mid-'70s also used the term "Disco-Vision Records" to refer to the pressed discs. MCA owned the rights to the largest catalog of films in the world during this time, and they manufactured and distributed the DiscoVision releases of those films under the "MCA DiscoVision" software and manufacturing label; consumer sale of those titles began on December 11, 1978, with the aforementioned Jaws.

Philips' preferred name for the format was "VLP", after the Dutch words Video Langspeel-Plaat ("Video long-play disc"), which in English-speaking countries stood for Video Long-Play. The first consumer player, the Magnavox VH-8000 even had the VLP logo on the player. For a while in the early and mid-1970s, Philips also discussed a compatible audio-only format they called "ALP", but that was soon dropped as the Compact Disc system became a non-compatible project in the Philips corporation. Until early 1980, the format had no "official" name. The LaserVision Association, made up of MCA, Universal-Pioneer, IBM, and Philips/Magnavox, was formed to standardize the technical specifications of the format (which had been causing problems for the consumer market) and finally named the system officially as "LaserVision".

After its introduction in Japan in 1981, the format was introduced in Europe in 1983 with the LaserVision name, although Philips used "VLP" in model designations, such as VLP-600. Following lackluster sales there (around 12–15,000 units Europe-wide), Philips tried relaunching the entire format as "CD-Video" in 1987, with the name appearing not just on the new hybrid 12 cm discs, but also on standard 20 and 30 cm LaserDiscs with digital audio. While this name and logo appeared on players and labels for years, the "official" name of the format remained LaserVision. In the early 1990s, the format's name was changed again to LaserDisc.

=== Pioneer ===
The LaserDisc turtle

Pioneer Electronics also entered the optical disc market in 1977 as a 50/50 joint venture with MCA called Universal-Pioneer and manufacturing MCA-designed industrial players under the MCA DiscoVision name (the PR-7800 and PR-7820). For the 1980 launch of the first Universal-Pioneer player, the VP-1000 was noted as a "laser disc player", although the "LaserDisc" logo was displayed clearly on the device. In 1981, "LaserDisc" was used exclusively for the medium itself, although the official name was "LaserVision" (as seen at the beginning of many LaserDisc releases, just before the start of the film). Pioneer reminded numerous video magazines and stores in 1984 that LaserDisc was a trademarked word, standing only for LaserVision products manufactured for sale by Pioneer Video or Pioneer Electronics. A 1984 Ray Charles ad for the LD-700 player bore the term "Pioneer LaserDisc brand videodisc player". From 1981 until the early 1990s, all properly licensed discs carried the LaserVision name and logo, even Pioneer Artists titles.

On single-sided LaserDiscs mastered by Pioneer, playing the wrong side would cause a still screen to appear with a happy, upside-down turtle that has a LaserDisc for a belly (nicknamed "Flippy"). The words "Program material is recorded on the other side of this disc" are below the turtle. This also appears on Japanese releases, with the text in Japanese.

=== MCA ===
During the early years, MCA also manufactured discs for other companies including Paramount, Disney and Warner Bros. Some of them added their own names to the disc jacket to signify that the movie was not owned by MCA. After DiscoVision Associates shut down in early 1982, Universal Studio's videodisc software label (called MCA Videodisc until 1984), began reissuing many DiscoVision titles. Unfortunately, quite a few, such as Battlestar Galactica and Jaws, were time-compressed versions of their CAV or CLV DiscoVision originals. The time-compressed CLV re-issue of Jaws no longer had the original soundtrack, having had incidental background music replaced for the videodisc version due to high licensing costs (the original music would not be available until the THX LaserDisc box set was released in 1995). One Universal/Columbia co-production issued by MCA Disco Vision in both CAV and CLV versions, The Electric Horseman, is still not available in any other home video format with its original score intact; even the most recent DVD release has had substantial music replacement of both instrumental score and Willie Nelson's songs. An MCA release of Universal's Howard the Duck shows only the start credits shown in widescreen before changing to 4:3 for the rest of the film. For many years, this was the only disc-based release of the film, until widescreen DVD formats were released with extras. Also, the 1989 and 1996 LaserDisc releases of E.T. the Extra-Terrestrial are the only formats to include the cut scene of Harrison Ford, in the role of the school principal, telling off Elliott for letting the frogs free in the biology class.

== Comparison with other formats ==
=== VHS ===
LaserDisc had several advantages over VHS. It featured a far sharper picture with a horizontal resolution of 425 television lines (TVL) for NTSC and 440 TVL for PAL discs, while VHS featured only 240 TVL with NTSC. Super VHS, released in 1987, reduced the quality gap, having horizontal luma resolution comparable to LaserDisc. But horizontal chroma resolution of Super VHS remained as low as that of standard VHS, about 40 TVL, while LaserDisc offered about 70 TVL of chroma resolution.

LaserDisc could handle analog and digital audio where VHS was mostly analog only (VHS could have PCM audio in professional applications but it was uncommon), and the NTSC discs could store multiple audio tracks. This allowed for extras such as director's commentary tracks and other features to be added onto a film, creating "Special Edition" releases that would not have been possible with VHS. Disc access was random and chapter-based, like the DVD format, meaning that one could jump to any point on a given disc very quickly. By comparison, VHS would require rewinding and fast-forwarding to get to specific points.

Initially, LaserDiscs were cheaper than videocassettes to manufacture, because they lacked the moving parts and plastic outer shell which were necessary for VHS tapes to work, and the duplication process was much simpler. A VHS cassette had at least 14 parts (including the actual tape) while LaserDisc had one part with five or six layers. A disc could be stamped out in a matter of seconds, whereas duplicating videotape required a complex bulk tape duplication mechanism and was a time-consuming process. By the end of the 1980s, average disc-pressing prices were over $5.00 per two-sided disc, due to the large amount of plastic material and the costly glass-mastering process needed to make the metal stamper mechanisms. Due to the larger volume of demand, videocassettes quickly became much cheaper to duplicate, costing as little as $1.00 by the beginning of the 1990s.

LaserDiscs potentially had a much longer lifespan than videocassettes. Because the discs were read optically instead of magnetically, no physical contact needed to be made between the player and the disc, except for the player's clamp that holds the disc at its center as it is spun and read. As a result, playback would not wear the information-bearing part of the discs, and properly manufactured LaserDiscs could theoretically last beyond a lifetime. By contrast, a VHS tape held all of its picture and sound information on the tape in a magnetic coating which was in contact with the spinning heads on the head drum, causing progressive wear with each use. The tape was also thin and delicate, and it was easy for a player mechanism, especially on a low quality or malfunctioning model, to mishandle the tape and damage it by creasing it, frilling (stretching) its edges, or even breaking it.

=== DVD ===
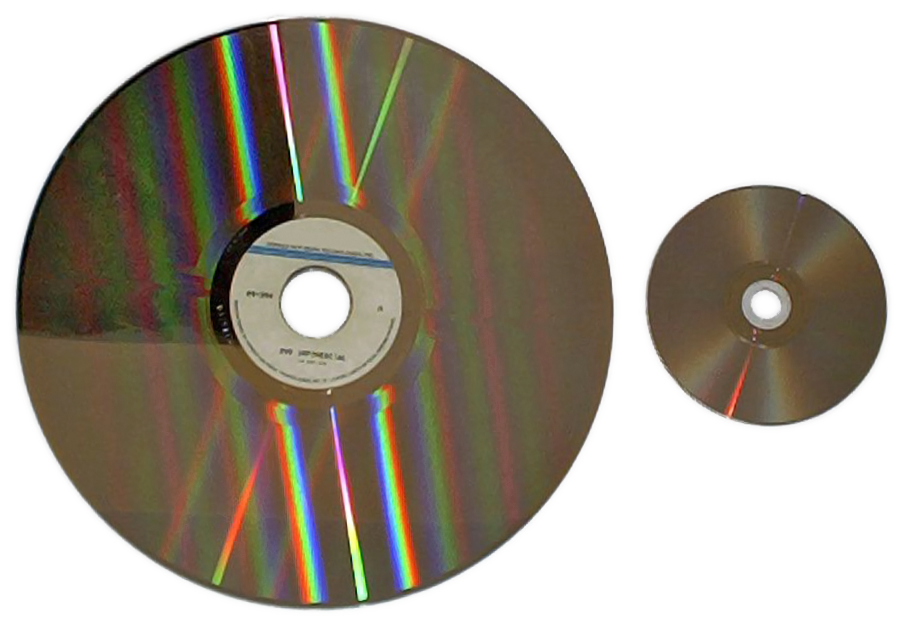
A Laserdisc (left) is much bigger than a DVD (right)

LaserDisc was a composite video format: the luminance (black and white) and chrominance (color) information were transmitted in one signal, separated by the receiver. While good comb filters could separate the signals adequately, the two signals could not be completely separated. On DVD-Video, images are stored in the YCbCr format, with the chroma information being entirely discrete, which results in far higher fidelity, particularly at strong color borders or regions of high detail (especially if there is moderate movement in the picture) and low-contrast details such as skin tones, where comb filters almost inevitably smudge some detail.

In contrast to the entirely digital DVD, LaserDiscs used only analog video. As the LaserDisc format was not digitally encoded and did not make use of compression techniques, it was immune to video macroblocking (most visible as blockiness during high motion sequences) or contrast banding (subtle visible lines in gradient areas, such as out-of-focus backgrounds, skies, or light casts from spotlights) which could be caused by the MPEG-2 encoding process as video is prepared for DVD. Early DVD releases held the potential to surpass their LaserDisc counterparts, but often managed only to match them for image quality, and in some cases, the LaserDisc version was preferred. Proprietary human-assisted encoders manually operated by specialists could vastly reduce the incidence of artifacts, depending on playing time and image complexity. By the end of LaserDisc's run, DVDs were living up to their potential as a superior format.

DVDs use compressed audio formats such as Dolby Digital and DTS for multichannel sound. Most LaserDiscs were encoded with stereo (often Dolby Surround) CD quality audio 16bit/44.1 kHz tracks as well as analog audio tracks.

DTS-encoded LaserDiscs have DTS soundtracks of 1,235 kbit/s instead of the reduced bitrate of 768 kbit/s commonly employed on DVDs with optional DTS audio.

=== Advantages ===
LaserDisc players could provide a greater degree of control over the playback process. Unlike many DVD players, the transport mechanism always obeyed commands from the user: pause, fast-forward, and fast-reverse commands were always accepted (barring malfunctions). There were no "User Prohibited Options" where content protection code instructed the player to refuse commands to skip a specific part (such as fast forwarding through copyright warnings). (Some DVD players, particularly higher-end units, do have the ability to ignore the blocking code and play the video without restrictions, but this feature is not common in the usual consumer market.)

With CAV LaserDiscs, the user could jump directly to any individual frame of a video simply by entering the frame number on the remote keypad, a feature not common among DVD players. Some DVD players have a cache feature, which stores a certain amount of the video in RAM, which allows the player to index a DVD as quickly as an LD, even down to the frame in some players.

Damaged spots on a LaserDisc could be played through or skipped over, while a DVD will often become unplayable past the damage. Some newer DVD players feature a repair+skip algorithm, which alleviates this problem by continuing to play the disc, filling in unreadable areas of the picture with blank space or a frozen frame of the last readable image and sound. The success of this feature depends upon the amount of damage. LaserDisc players, when working in full analog, recover from such errors faster than DVD players.

Similar to the CD versus LP sound quality debates common in the audiophile community, some videophiles argue that LaserDisc maintains a "smoother", more "film-like", natural image while DVD still looks slightly more artificial. Early DVD demo discs often had compression or encoding problems, lending additional support to such claims at the time. The video signal-to-noise ratio and bandwidth of LaserDisc are substantially less than those of DVDs, making DVDs appear sharper and clearer to most viewers.

Another advantage, at least to some consumers, was that any sort of anti-piracy technology was purely optional. It was claimed that Macrovision's Analog Protection System could not be applied to LaserDisc, due to the format's design. The vertical blanking interval, where the Macrovision signal would be implemented, was used for timecode and frame coding as well as player control codes on LaserDisc players. Due to its relatively small market share, there was never a push to redesign the format despite the obvious potential for piracy. The industry simply decided to engineer it into the DVD specification.

LaserDisc's support for multiple audio tracks allowed for vast supplemental materials to be included on-disc and made it the first available format for "Special Edition" releases; the 1984 Criterion Collection edition of Citizen Kane is generally credited as being the first "Special Edition" release to home video (King Kong being the first release to have an audio commentary track included), and for setting the standard by which future "Special Edition" discs were measured. The disc provided interviews, commentary tracks, documentaries, still photographs, and other features for historians and collectors.

=== Disadvantages ===
Despite the advantages over competing technology at the time (namely VHS and Betamax), the discs were heavy—weighing about 250 grams (8.8 oz) each—and cumbersome, were more prone than a VHS tape to damage if mishandled, and manufacturers did not market LaserDisc units with recording capabilities to consumers. Also, because of their size, greater mechanical effort was required to spin the discs at the proper speed, resulting in much more noise generated than other media.

The space-consuming analog video signal of a LaserDisc limited playback duration to 30/36 minutes (CAV NTSC/PAL) or 60/64 minutes (CLV NTSC/PAL) per side, because of the hardware manufacturer's refusal to reduce line count and bandwidth for increased playtime, (as was done in VHS; VHS tapes had a 3 MHz video bandwidth, while LaserDisc preserves the full 6 MHz bandwidth and resolution used in NTSC broadcasts). After one side finished playing, a disc had to be flipped over to continue watching a movie, and some titles filled two or more discs, depending on the film's runtime and whether or not special features are included. Many players, especially units built after the mid-1980s, could "flip" discs automatically (by rotating the optical pickup to the other side of the disc), but this was accompanied by a pause in the movie during the side change.

In the event the movie was longer than what could be stored on two sides of a single disc, manually swapping to a second disc was required at some point during the film (one exception to this rule was the Pioneer LD-W1, which featured the ability to load two discs and to play each side of one disc and then to switch to playing each side of the other disc). In addition, perfect still frames and random access to individual still frames was limited only to the more expensive CAV discs, which only had a playing time of approximately 30 minutes per side. In later years, Pioneer and other manufacturers overcame this limitation by incorporating a digital memory buffer, which "grabbed" a single field or frame from a CLV disc.

The analog information encoded onto LaserDiscs also did not include any form of built-in checksum or error correction. Because of this, slight dust and scratches on the disc surface could result in read errors which caused various video quality problems: glitches, streaks, bursts of static, or momentary picture interruptions. In contrast, the digital MPEG-2 format information used on DVDs has built-in error correction which ensures that the signal from a damaged disc will remain identical to that from a perfect disc right up until the damage to the disc surface prevents the laser from being able to identify usable data.

In addition, LaserDisc videos sometimes exhibited a problem known as "crosstalk". The issue could arise when the laser optical pickup assembly within the player was out of alignment or because the disc was damaged or excessively warped. But it could also occur even with a properly functioning player and a factory-new disc, depending on electrical and mechanical alignment problems. In these instances, the issue arose due to CLV discs requiring subtle changes in rotating speed at various points during playback. During a change in speed, the optical pickup inside the player might read video information from a track adjacent to the intended one, causing data from the two tracks to "cross"; the extra video information picked up from that second track shows up as distortion in the picture which looks reminiscent of swirling "barber poles" or rolling lines of static.

Assuming the player's optical pickup was in proper working order, crosstalk distortion normally did not occur during playback of CAV-format LaserDiscs, as the rotational speed never varied. If the player calibration was out of order, or if the CAV disc was faulty or damaged, other problems affecting tracking accuracy could occur. One such problem was "laser lock", where the player read the same two fields for a given frame over and over, causing the picture to look frozen as if the movie were paused.

Another significant issue unique to LaserDisc involved the inconsistency of playback quality between different makers and models of player. On the majority of televisions, a given DVD player will produce a picture that is visually indistinguishable from other units; differences in image quality between players only becomes easily apparent on larger televisions, and substantial leaps in image quality are generally only obtained with expensive, high-end players that allow for post-processing of the MPEG-2 stream during playback.

In contrast, LaserDisc playback quality was highly dependent on hardware quality, and major variances in picture quality appeared between different makers and models of LaserDisc players, even when tested on low- to mid-range televisions. The obvious benefits of using high-quality equipment helped keep demand for some players high, while also keeping pricing for those units comparably high: in the 1990s, notable players sold for anywhere from US$200 to well over $1,000, while older and less desirable players could be purchased in working condition for as little as $25.

==== Laser rot ====
Many early LaserDiscs were not manufactured properly. The adhesive that was used contained impurities which were able to penetrate the lacquer seal layer and chemically attack the metalized reflective aluminum layer, altering its reflective characteristics. This, in turn, deteriorated the recorded signal. This was a problem that was termed "laser rot" among LaserDisc enthusiasts (also called "color flash" internally by LaserDisc pressing plants). Some forms of laser rot could appear as black spots that looked like mold or burned plastic which caused the disc to skip and the video to exhibit excessive speckling noise. But, for the most part, rotted discs could actually appear perfectly fine to the naked eye.

Later optical standards have also been known to suffer similar problems, including a notorious batch of defective CDs manufactured by Philips-DuPont Optical at their Blackburn, Lancashire facility in England during the late 1980s/early 1990s.

== Impact and decline ==
LaserDisc did not have high market penetration in North America due to the high cost of the players and discs (which were far more expensive than VHS players and tapes), and due to marketplace confusion with the technologically inferior CED, which also went by the name Videodisc. While the format was not widely adopted by North American consumers, it was received well among videophiles due to the superior audio and video quality compared to VHS and Betamax tapes, thus finding a place in nearly one million American homes by the end of 1990. The format was more popular in Japan than in North America because prices were kept low to ensure adoption, resulting in minimal price differences between VHS tapes and the higher quality LaserDiscs, which helped ensure that it quickly became the dominant consumer video format in Japan. Anime collectors in every country in which the LaserDisc format was released (which included both North America and Japan) also quickly became familiar with this format, and sought the higher video and sound quality of LaserDisc and the availability of numerous titles not available on VHS. (They were also encouraged by Pioneer's in-house production of anime which made titles specifically with the format in mind.)

The format also became quite popular in Hong Kong during the 1990s before the introduction of VCDs and DVD. While people rarely bought the discs (because each LaserDisc was priced around US$100), high rental activity helped the video rental business in the city grow larger than it had ever been previously. Due to integration with the Japanese export market, NTSC LaserDiscs were used in the Hong Kong market, in contrast to the PAL standard used for broadcast (this anomaly also exists for DVD). This created a market for multi-system TVs and multi-system VCRs which could display or play both PAL and NTSC materials in addition to SECAM materials (which were never popular in Hong Kong). Some LaserDisc players could convert NTSC signals to PAL during playback so that TVs used in Hong Kong could display the LaserDisc materials.

Despite the relative popularity, manufacturers refused to market recordable LaserDisc devices on the consumer market, even though the competing VCR devices could record onto cassette. This had a negative impact on sales worldwide. The inconvenient disc size, the high cost of both the players and the media and the inability to record onto the discs combined to take a serious toll on sales, and contributed to the format's poor adoption figures.

=== Later years: 1996-2001 ===
By 1995, several companies began to invest in the developing DVD and knew that the future of LaserDisc was to be short-lived. The Video Software Dealers Association (VSDA) Convention in the middle of 1996 though highlighted the mixed consensus by some executives whether or not LaserDisc could be replaced by DVD. Throughout 1996, knowledge about DVD spread through the public and the sale of LaserDisc players was already noticeably diminishing by 1996. Nevertheless, sales of LaserDisc titles stood relatively firm (though with a small decline) around the same time. This was aided by the delayed release of DVD which was supposed to occur around Labor Day Weekend, 1996.

Although the LaserDisc format was supplanted by DVD by the late 1990s, many LaserDisc titles are still highly coveted by movie enthusiasts (for example, Disney's Song of the South which is unavailable in the US in any format, but was issued in Japan on LaserDisc.) This is largely because there are many films that are still only available on LaserDisc and many other LaserDisc releases contain supplementary material not available on subsequent DVD versions of those films. Until the end of 2001, many titles were released on VHS, LaserDisc, and DVD in Japan.

== Further developments and applications ==
=== Computer control ===
In the early 1980s, Philips produced a LaserDisc player model adapted for a computer interface, dubbed "professional." In 1985, Jasmine Multimedia created LaserDisc jukeboxes featuring music videos from Michael Jackson, Duran Duran, and Cyndi Lauper. When connected to a PC this combination could be used to display images or information for educational or archival purposes, for example, thousands of scanned medieval manuscripts. This device could be considered a very early equivalent of a CD-ROM.

In the mid-1980s Lucasfilm pioneered the EditDroid non-linear editing system for film and television based on computer-controlled LaserDisc players. Instead of printing dailies out on film, processed negatives from the day's shoot would be sent to a mastering plant to be assembled from their 10-minute camera elements into 20-minute film segments. These were then mastered onto single-sided blank LaserDiscs, just as a DVD would be burnt at home today, allowing for much easier selection and preparation of an edit decision list (EDL). In the days before video assist was available in cinematography, this was the only other way a film crew could see their work. The EDL went to the negative cutter who then cut the camera negative accordingly and assembled the finished film. Only 24 EditDroid systems were ever built, even though the ideas and technology are still in use today. Later EditDroid experiments borrowed from hard-drive technology of having multiple discs on the same spindle and added numerous playback heads and numerous electronics to the basic jukebox design so that any point on each of the discs would be accessible within seconds. This eliminated the need for racks and racks of industrial LaserDisc players since EditDroid discs were only single-sided.

In 1986, a SCSI-equipped LaserDisc player attached to a BBC Master computer was used for the BBC Domesday Project. The player was referred as an LV-ROM (LaserVision Read Only Memory) as the discs contained the driving software as well as the video frames. The discs used the CAV format, and encoded data as a binary signal represented by the analog audio recording. These discs could contain in each CAV frame video/audio or video/binary data, but not both. "Data" frames would appear blank when played as video. It was typical for each disc to start with the disc catalog (a few blank frames) then the video introduction before the rest of the data. Because the format (based on the ADFS hard disc format) used a starting sector for each file, the data layout effectively skipped over any video frames. If all 54,000 frames are used for data storage an LV-ROM disc can contain 324 MB of data per side. The Domesday Project systems also included a genlock, allowing video frames, clips and audio to be mixed with graphics originated from the BBC Master; this was used to great effect for displaying high-resolution photographs and maps, which could then be zoomed into.

During the 1980s in the United States, Digital Equipment Corporation developed the standalone PC control IVIS (Interactive VideoDisc Information System) for training and education. One of the most influential programs developed at DEC was Decision Point, a management gaming simulation, which won the Nebraska Video Disc Award for Best of Show in 1985.

Apple's HyperCard scripting language provided Macintosh computer users with a means to design databases of slides, animation, video and sounds from LaserDiscs and then to create interfaces for users to play specific content from the disc through software called LaserStacks. User-created "stacks" were shared and were especially popular in education where teacher-generated stacks were used to access discs ranging from art collections to basic biological processes. Commercially available stacks were also popular with the Voyager company being possibly the most successful distributor.

Commodore International's 1992 multimedia presentation system for the Amiga, AmigaVision, included device drivers for controlling a number of LaserDisc players through a serial port. Coupled with the Amiga's ability to use a Genlock, this allowed for the LaserDisc video to be overlaid with computer graphics and integrated into presentations and multimedia displays, years before such practice was commonplace.

Pioneer also made computer-controlled units such as the LD-V2000. It had a back-panel RS-232 serial connection through a five-pin DIN connector, and no front-panel controls except Open/Close. (The disc would be played automatically upon insertion.)

Under contract from the U.S. military, Matrox produced a combination computer/LaserDisc player for instructional purposes. The computer was a 286, the LaserDisc player only capable of reading the analog audio tracks. Together they weighed 43 lb (20 kg) and sturdy handles were provided in case two people were required to lift the unit. The computer controlled the player via a 25-pin serial port at the back of the player and a ribbon cable connected to a proprietary port on the motherboard. Many of these were sold as surplus by the military during the 1990s, often without the controller software. Nevertheless, it is possible to control the unit by removing the ribbon cable and connecting a serial cable directly from the computer's serial port to the port on the LaserDisc player.

=== Video games ===
The format's instant-access capability made it possible for a new breed of LaserDisc-based video arcade games. Several companies saw potential in using LaserDiscs for video games in the 1980s and 1990s, beginning in 1983 with Sega's Astron Belt. Cinematronics and American Laser Games produced elaborate arcade games that used the random-access features to create interactive movies such as Dragon's Lair and Space Ace. Similarly, the Pioneer Laseractive and Halcyon were introduced as home video game consoles that used LaserDisc media for their software.

=== Hi-Vision LD ===
Hi-Vision LD
- Media type: Optical disc
- Encoding: MUSE
- Capacity: 60 minutes per side on CLV discs
- Read mechanism: 670 nm wavelength semiconductor laser
- Released: 1994

In 1991, several manufacturers announced specifications for what would become known as Hi-Vision LD, representing a span of almost 15 years until the feats of this HD analog optical disc system would finally be duplicated digitally by HD DVD and Blu-ray Disc. Encoded using NHK's MUSE "Hi-Vision" analog HDTV system, MUSE discs would operate like standard LaserDiscs but would contain high-definition 1,125-line (1,035 visible lines; Sony HDVS) video with a 16:9 aspect ratio. The MUSE players were also capable of playing standard NTSC format discs and are superior in performance to non-MUSE players even with these NTSC discs. The MUSE-capable players had several noteworthy advantages over standard LaserDisc players, including a red laser with a much narrower wavelength than the lasers found in standard players. The red laser was capable of reading through disc defects such as scratches and even mild disc rot that would cause most other players to stop, stutter or drop-out. Crosstalk was not an issue with MUSE discs, and the narrow wavelength of the laser allowed for the virtual elimination of crosstalk with normal discs.

To view MUSE-encoded discs, it was necessary to have a MUSE decoder in addition to a compatible player. There are televisions with MUSE decoding built-in and set-top tuners with decoders that can provide the proper MUSE input. Equipment prices were high, especially for early HDTVs which generally eclipsed US$10,000, and even in Japan the market for MUSE was tiny. Players and discs were never officially sold in North America, although several distributors imported MUSE discs along with other import titles. Terminator 2: Judgment Day, Lawrence of Arabia, A League of Their Own, Bugsy, Close Encounters of the Third Kind, Bram Stoker's Dracula and Chaplin were among the theatrical releases available on MUSE LDs. Several documentaries, including one about Formula One at Japan's Suzuka Circuit were also released.

LaserDisc players and LaserDiscs that worked with the competing European HD-MAC HDTV standard were also made.

=== Picture discs ===
Picture discs have artistic etching on one side of the disc to make the disc more visually attractive than the standard shiny silver surface. This etching might look like a movie character, logo, or other promotional material. Sometimes that side of the LD would be made with colored plastic, rather than the clear material used for the data side. Picture disc LDs only had video material on one side as the "picture" side could not contain any data. Picture discs are rare in North America.

=== LD-G ===
Pioneer Electronics—one of the format's largest supporters/investors—was also deeply involved in the karaoke business in Japan, and used LaserDiscs as the storage medium for music and additional content such as graphics. This format was generally called LD-G. While several other karaoke labels manufactured LaserDiscs, there was nothing like the breadth of competition in that industry that exists now, as almost all manufacturers have transitioned to CD+G discs.

=== Anamorphic LaserDiscs ===
With the release of 16:9 televisions in the early 1990s, Pioneer and Toshiba decided that it was time to take advantage of this aspect ratio. Squeeze LDs were enhanced 16:9-ratio widescreen LaserDiscs. During the video transfer stage, the movie was stored in an anamorphic "squeezed" format. The widescreen movie image was stretched to fill the entire video frame with less or none of the video resolution wasted to create letterbox bars. The advantage was a 33% greater vertical resolution compared to letterboxed widescreen LaserDisc. This same procedure was used for anamorphic DVDs, but unlike all DVD players, very few LD players had the ability to unsqueeze the image for 4:3 sets. If the discs were played on a standard 4:3 television the image would be distorted. Some 4:3 sets (such as the Sony WEGA series) could be set to unsqueeze the image. Since very few people outside of Japan owned 16:9 displays, the marketability of these special discs was very limited.

There were no anamorphic LaserDisc titles available in the US except for promotional purposes. Upon purchase of a Toshiba 16:9 television viewers had the option of selecting a number of Warner Bros. 16:9 films. Titles include Unforgiven, Grumpy Old Men, The Fugitive, and Free Willy. The Japanese lineup of titles was different. A series of releases under the banner "Squeeze LD" from Pioneer of mostly Carolco titles included Basic Instinct, Stargate, Terminator 2: Judgment Day, Showgirls, Cutthroat Island, and Cliffhanger. Terminator 2 was released twice in Squeeze LD, the second release being THX-certified and a notable improvement over the first.

=== Recordable formats ===
Several recordable variants of the LaserDisc format were developed for professional and industrial applications, but none were marketed to consumers. Their limited availability contributed to the common perception that LaserDisc lacked recording capability.

The Recordable Laser Videodisc (RLV), introduced by the Optical Disc Corporation in 1984, was a write-once, read-many format that was fully compatible with standard LaserDisc players. Compared to conventional LaserDiscs, RLVs were distinguished by a red/purple tint of the dye used in the reflective layer that is burned by the laser.

The Component Recordable Video disc (CRVdisc), developed by Sony, was another write-once, read-many format intended for professional use. Housed in a protective caddy, the disc resembled an oversized floppy disk. The CRVdisc was used by the BBC for many years to playout idents.

The LaserRecorder, introduced by Pioneer in fall 1991, was a rewritable LaserDisc system designed for professional video production. It used CAV mode and protective caddies, with discs, which could hold 32 minutes of video per side, were rated for up to one million record/erase cycles. The dual-laser design enabled real-time, frame-accurate non-linear editing by allowing one laser to read while the other searched. The system's rapid access made it useful for editing workflows, including its integration into EditDroid, an early digital film editing system. The recorder sold for around US$39,950 (equivalent to $91,657 in 2025), with blank discs priced at approximately US$1,295 (equivalent to $2,971 in 2025).

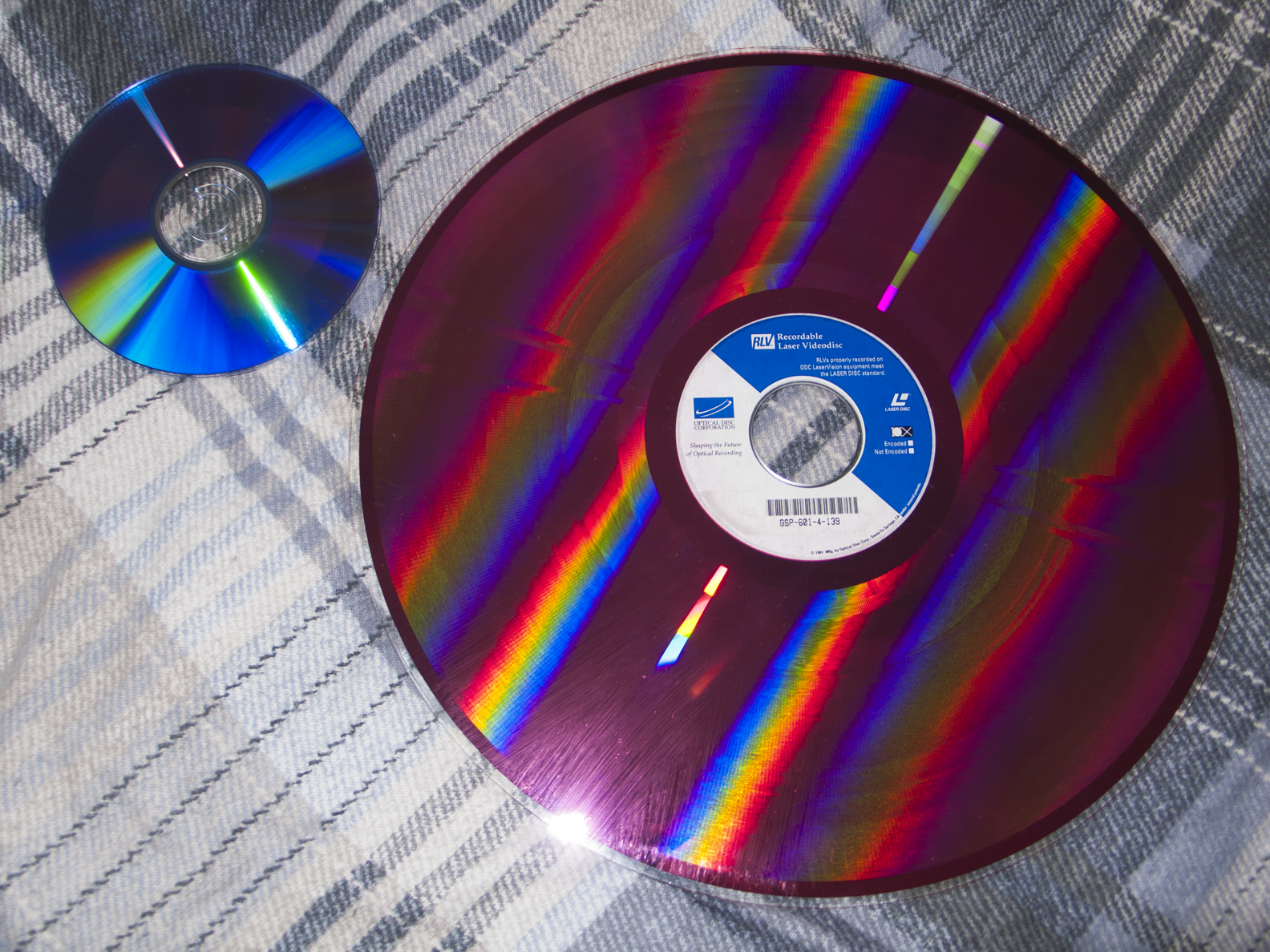
A Recordable Laser Videodisc with a DVD-R for size comparison

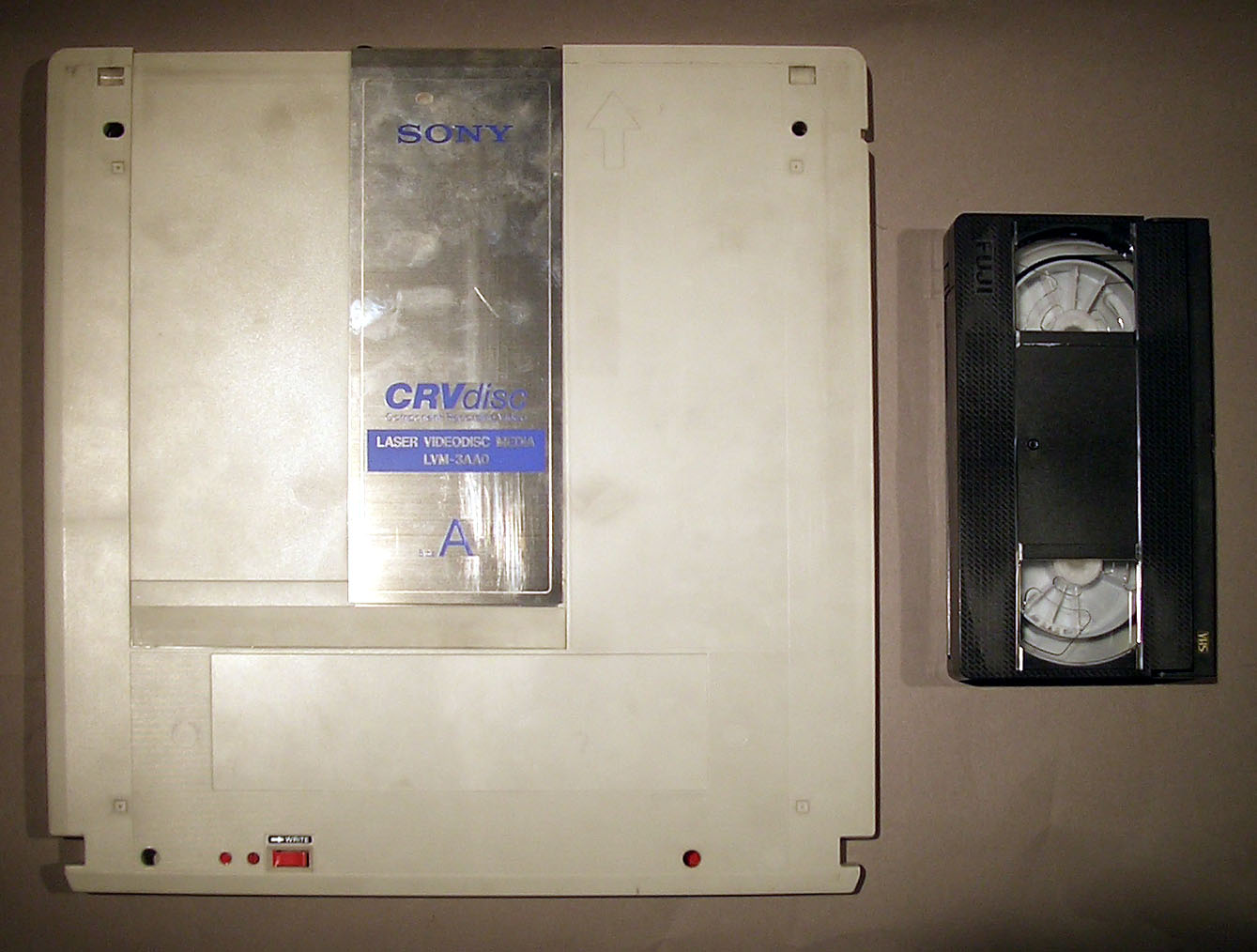
A CRVdisc with a VHS tape for size comparison

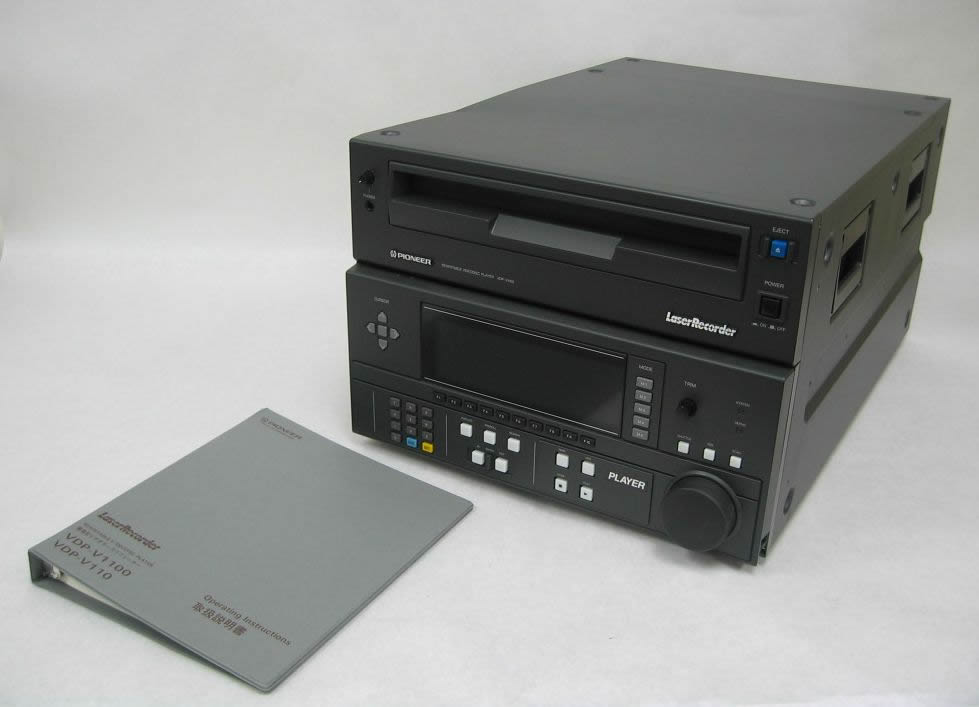
A Pioneer LaserRecorder that can be connected to a computer or a video source

== LaserDisc sizes ==
=== 30 cm (Full-size) ===
The most common size of LaserDisc was 30 cm (11.8 in), approximately the size of 12 in (30.5 cm) LP vinyl records. These discs allowed for 30/36 minutes per side (CAV NTSC/PAL) or 60/64 minutes per side (CLV NTSC/PAL). The vast majority of programming for the LaserDisc format was produced on these discs.

=== 20 cm ("EP"-size) ===
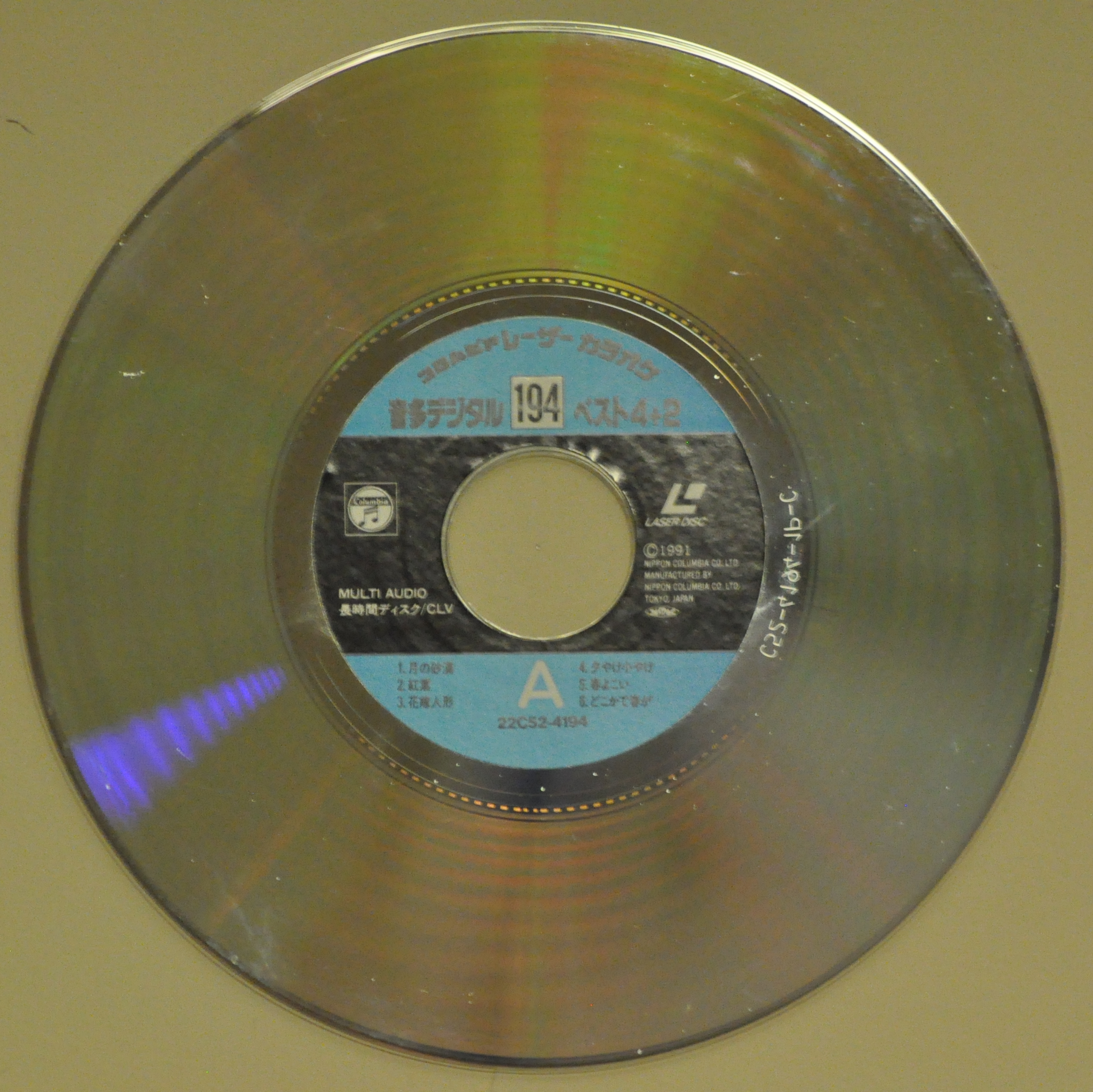
A 20 cm Japanese NTSC LaserDisc for karaoke

A number of 20 cm (7.9 in) LaserDiscs were also published. These smaller "EP"-sized LDs allowed for 20 minutes per side (CLV). They are much rarer than the full-size LDs, especially in North America, and roughly approximate the size of 45 rpm (7 in (17.8 cm)) vinyl singles. These discs were often used for music video compilations (e.g. Bon Jovi's "Breakout" and Bananarama's "Video Singles") as well as Japanese karaoke machines.

=== 12 cm (CD Video and Video Single Disc) ===
There were also 12 cm (4.7 in) (CD size) "single"-style discs produced that were playable on LaserDisc players. These were referred to as CD Video (CD-V) discs, and Video Single Discs (VSD).

CD-V was a hybrid format launched in the late 1980s, and carried up to five minutes of analog LaserDisc-type video content with a digital soundtrack (usually a music video), plus up to 20 minutes of digital audio CD tracks. The original 1989 release of David Bowie's retrospective Sound + Vision CD box set prominently featured a CD-V video of "Ashes to Ashes", and standalone promo CD-Vs featured the video, plus three audio tracks: "John, I'm Only Dancing", "Changes", and "The Supermen".

Despite the similar name, CD Video is entirely incompatible with the later all-digital Video CD (VCD) format, and can only be played back on LaserDisc players with CD-V capability or one of the players dedicated to the smaller discs. (Note: By contrast, VCD is generally supported by VCD, DVD, CD-i, and HD-DVD players, Blu-ray players with MPEG-1 support, and computers, along with later-model LaserDisc players that can also play DVDs, such as the DVL-9xx series from Pioneer.)

In Europe, Philips also used the "CD Video" name as part of a short-lived attempt in the late 1980s to relaunch and rebrand the entire LaserDisc system. Some 20 and 30 cm discs were also branded "CD Video", but unlike the 12 cm discs, these were essentially just standard LaserDiscs with digital soundtracks and no audio-only CD content.

The VSD format was announced in 1990, and was essentially the same as the 12 cm (4.7 in) CD-V, but without the audio CD tracks, and intended to sell at a lower price. VSDs were popular only in Japan and other parts of Asia and were never fully introduced to the rest of the world.
