= Pioneer PR-7820 =

The Pioneer PR-7820 was the first mass-produced industrial LaserDisc player, sold originally as the MCA DiscoVision PR-7820. This unit was used in many General Motors dealerships as a source of training videos and presentation of GM's new line of cars and trucks in the late 1970s and early 1980s. After MCA DiscoVision shut down, Pioneer continued to sell the player under the Pioneer name as the Pioneer Model-III. The unit was a full Level-III player and could accept a data-dump from discs themselves. It could also be controlled by an external computer and could be genlocked to external video sources.

== Overview ==
The PR-7820 is the only player ever sold to either the industrial or consumer market that was entirely designed and engineered by the technicians at MCA Disco-Vision and contained all of their preferred design approaches, such as playing the disc with the laser on top (instead of underneath) and moving the disc radially to provide tracking instead of moving the laser radially. MCA engineers designed the player at the DiscoVision labs in Torrance, California and Universal-Pioneer mass-produced it in Japan. The PR-7820 was such a high-quality player that MCA themselves used it at their DiscoVision disc pressing plant in Carson, California for quality control checks of both master discs and finished sets. Unfortunately, this caused problems because the PR-7820 could easily play discs that the consumer player, the Magnavox VH-8000, could not cope with.

== Updates ==
In 1980, Discovision Associates released a factory update (it could also be retrofitted to existing PR-7820s) that reduced disc search times to less than 3 seconds, and added the ability to jump up to 99 tracks during vertical blanking, giving essentially "instant" searches. An external computer interface box was also made available at the same time which contained additional memory that increased the total size of a disc-based computer program the PR-7820 could store and execute to 256k.

== Tracking ==
The PR-7820 was the first LD player to use solid-state tangential tracking — instead of a tangential tracking mirror, the PR-7820 used an electronic CCD delay line to provide tangential tracking corrections, giving the player superb color quality. It wasn't until 1985/6 that the tangential mirror began to be replaced by electronic correction, first by Yamaha in their first consumer LD player, and eventually, by Pioneer themselves.

== Pricing ==
MCA DiscoVision had no suggested retail price for the PR-7820. Depending on the number purchased, it varied from $3,500 to $2,200 per unit if more than 1000 were bought at once.
