= David Paul Gregg =

American engineer and inventor (1923–2001)

- Born: March 11, 1923
- Died: November 8, 2001 (aged 78); Culver City, California, U.S.
- Occupations: Engineer, inventor

David Paul Gregg (March 11, 1923 – November 8, 2001) was an American engineer. He was the inventor of the optical disc (disk). Gregg was inspired to create the optical disc in 1958 while working at California electronics company Westrex, a part of Western Electric. His U.S. patent 3,350,503 for a "Videodisk" was filed in March 1962 while working at 3M's Mincom division to advance electron beam recording and reproducing, but not granted until October, 1967.

Gregg worked at Mincom with experienced television videotape engineers Wayne Johnson and Dean De Moss. The three men subsequently filed patents to cover a disc-recording system, a way to duplicate discs, and reproducing TV signals from photographic discs. When Mincom contracted Stanford's SRI to further the research, Gregg left and formed his own company, Gauss Electrophysics.

In 1968, the Gregg and Gauss patents were purchased by MCA (Music Corporation of America), which helped develop the technology. His designs and patents paved the way for the LaserDisc, which helped with the creation of the DVD, compact discs, and MiniDisc. In 1963, he also invented a video disk camera which could store several minutes' worth of images onto an optical video disk. There were no patents filed for the camera and little is known about it. Gregg died in Culver City, California, in November 2001 at the age of 78.

When Gregg conceived his invention, he imagined himself as a consumer. He intuited that the LaserDisc (also known as the optical disc), "had to be of extremely low-cost, which implied the utmost simplicity, lowest material and processing costs, and user friendliness."

== See also ==
- James Russell (inventor)
- Optical recording
