= Differential vascular labeling =

Differential Vascular Labeling is a labeling method that enables differentiation between the blood and lymphatic systems for intravital imaging. This approach exploits the differences in particle distribution across blood and lymphatic endothelia. DVL is based on a single intravenous injection of fluorescent particles of different sizes. Due to the differential distribution of fluorescent particles by size, the larger particles remain in the blood, whereas the smaller ones diffuse out of the blood and into the lymphatic system, thus functionally labeling the vasculature. Vascular system differentiation by DVL allows for real-time observation of cell traffic across physiological barriers, including lymphocyte traffic and tumor cell metastasis. DVL provides a means to differentially study the roles of angiogenesis and lymphangiogenesis in tumor metastasis. Lastly, DVL's intrinsic fluid phase labeling enables single-field fluid (either blood or lymph) velocity analysis in intact vascular systems. Thus, DVL allows for the simultaneous determination of fluid flow rates in diverse blood and lymphatic compartments and in newly formed tumor vessels.
