= Pioneer DVL =

Series of Laserdisc players

The DVL-XXXX Series of LaserDisc home video players were manufactured by Pioneer Corporation and were some of the last LaserDisc players manufactured before the format's retirement. They Included the capability of playing LaserDisc, CD Video, Audio CD, and DVD.

== DVL-700 ==
The DVL-700 was the world's first consumer available LaserDisc–DVD combination player. It Included S-Video outputs and a Graphic User Interface GUI, sported separate disc loading doors for LaserDisc and CD/DVD media, and employed the Gamma-turn Both Side Play mechanism.

== DVL-9 ==
A bestseller in Japan, played LaserDisc, DVD and audio and video CDs with an impressive performance. When using LaserDisc movies, the disc player included Both Side Play (BSP). This feature enabled the device to begin playing side 2 of LaserDisc media without requiring the user to flip the disc over. Both Side Play as implemented in the DVL-9 used a new, faster type of BSP system which reduced the time required to resume playback.

== DVL-90 ==
This video and audio player was a part of Pioneer's Elite Series models. Similar to the DVL-9 In features.

== DVL-909 ==
This late 90s model of combination player included several new features. Including both side play (auto reverse), digital audio outputs, S-Video outputs, component video outputs. This model had a good selling point as the European (PAL) and North American (NTSC) models could play both NTSC and PAL region LaserDiscs freely. The LaserDisc play quality is average but is superior to the other mid range and low end models produced in the early '90s. Noise level is low and image is sharp and stable. DVD play quality is however not even catching up to the cheaper DVD players that can be bought at discount stores today.

Note that the component signal only works for DVD but not LD. LD playback output only available on composite and S-video output. No progressive scan for the component output as well.

== DVL-91 ==
This is Pioneer's second DVL model combination player of the Elite Series line. This player included a separate DVD/CD–LaserDisc door, a new and improved GUI, memory of last scene played on LaserDisc and DVD, DTS support for DVD, and Both Side Play.

== DVL-919/DVL-919E ==
Similar to above models, it included a front display dimmer, DTS support for DVD, faster Both Side Play execution, frame step play, and a video transfer rate indicator.

Until its discontinuation, the DVL-919 was the only LaserDisc player left on the market in North America, retailing for nearly $999.

DVL-919E can play both PAL and NTSC laser discs. NTSC discs can also be output in PAL 60 format.

The face plate of DVL-919E is made of aluminum (same as DVL-909) while DVL-919's face plate is made of plastic.

On January 14, 2009, Pioneer announced that it would stop manufacturing the DVL-919 and other laser disc players.

== DVL-H9 ==
DVL-H9 is the only high-end LD-DVD combo player and it is only sold in Japan. It looks similar to -919 but it is heavier and taller. The weight is 17kg.

The side boards and face plate are made of extruded aluminum and the top cover is 2 mm thick steel board covered by aluminum board.

DVD playback part is based on DV-9, and thus its component video output for DVD supports progressive scan (while DVL-919 only support interlaced).

Audio functions are also improved and support 24-bit 96kHz Legato Link S (while -919 is without ‘S’). All its RCA connectors are gold-plated (compare to version DVL-919 only use nickel-plated RCA connectors).

The remote control for -H9 is the same used for version DVL-919, the model is DV027.

The "subtitle" key in the remote works for LD as well, this is because the DVL-H9 has a built-in LD-G decoder.

Laser pickups are identical to -919. Mechanical is similar to -H9 but some parts enhanced with rubber board glued to reduce the vibration.

Though it is marketed for in Japan only which uses 100 V utility power, the switch power supply was designed to last 125 VAC. Thus if users in United States buy this machine to use in North America, the machine can work safely without using a step down transformer.

== DVL-V888/DVL-K88 ==
This Combination Player included most of the above features and a Karaoke Playing feature. The Karaoke Feature had Vocal Scoring features based on how on-key the vocalist is singing.
