= CD Video =

Hybrid analog video/digital audio format

CD Video (CDV)

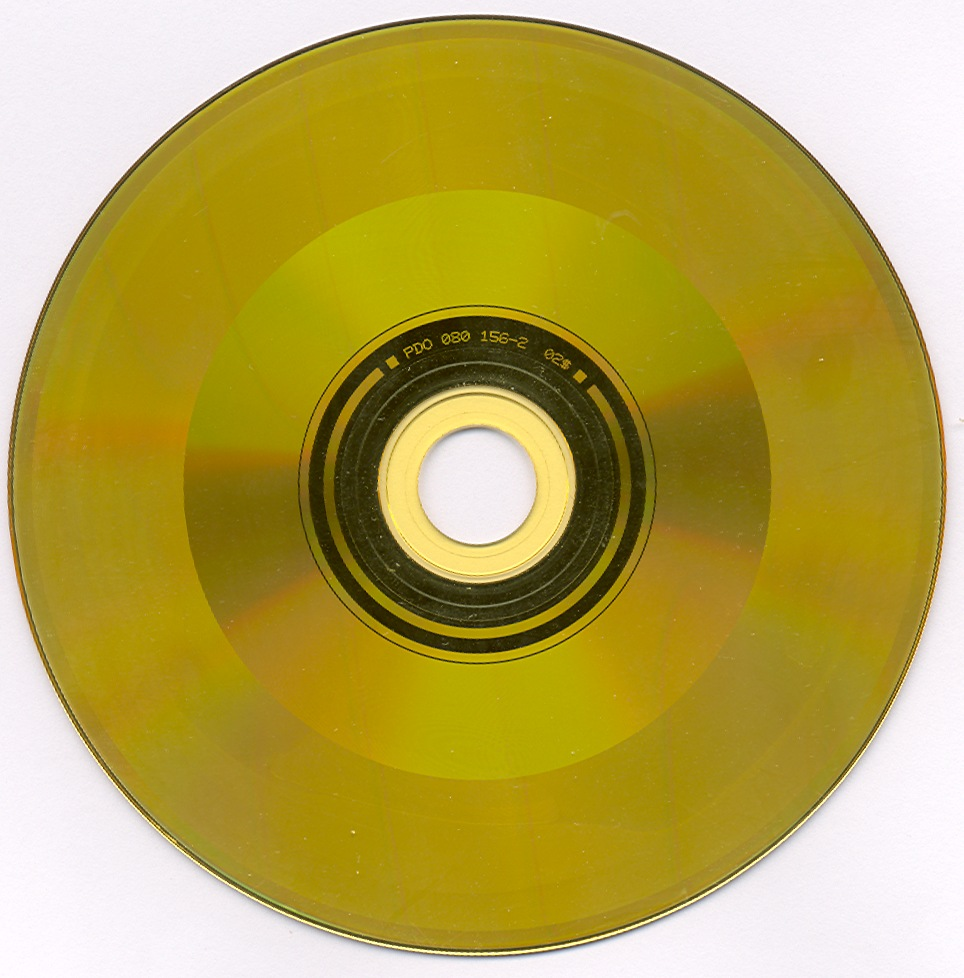
- Media type: Optical disc
- Encoding: analog video + digital audio
- Capacity: Up to 185 MB + 5 min analog LaserDisc video
- Read mechanism: 780 nm wavelength semiconductor laser
- Standard: IEC 61104（12cm）
- Developed by: Sony, Philips, Panasonic, Samsung
- Usage: audio and video storage
- Released: 1987

CD Video (also known as CDV, CD-V, or CD+V) is a format of optical media disc that was introduced in 1987 that combines the technologies of standard compact disc and LaserDisc. CD-V discs are the same size as a standard 12 cm (4.7 in) audio CD, and contain up to 20 minutes of CD audio that can be played on any audio CD player. They also contain up to 5 minutes of analog LaserDisc video information with a digital CD-quality soundtrack, which can be played back on a newer LaserDisc player capable of playing CD-V discs or CD-V-only players.

The "CD Video" brand was also used to market some 20 cm (7.9 in) and 30 cm (12 in) LaserDiscs which included a digital soundtrack but no CD-compatible content.

== Description ==
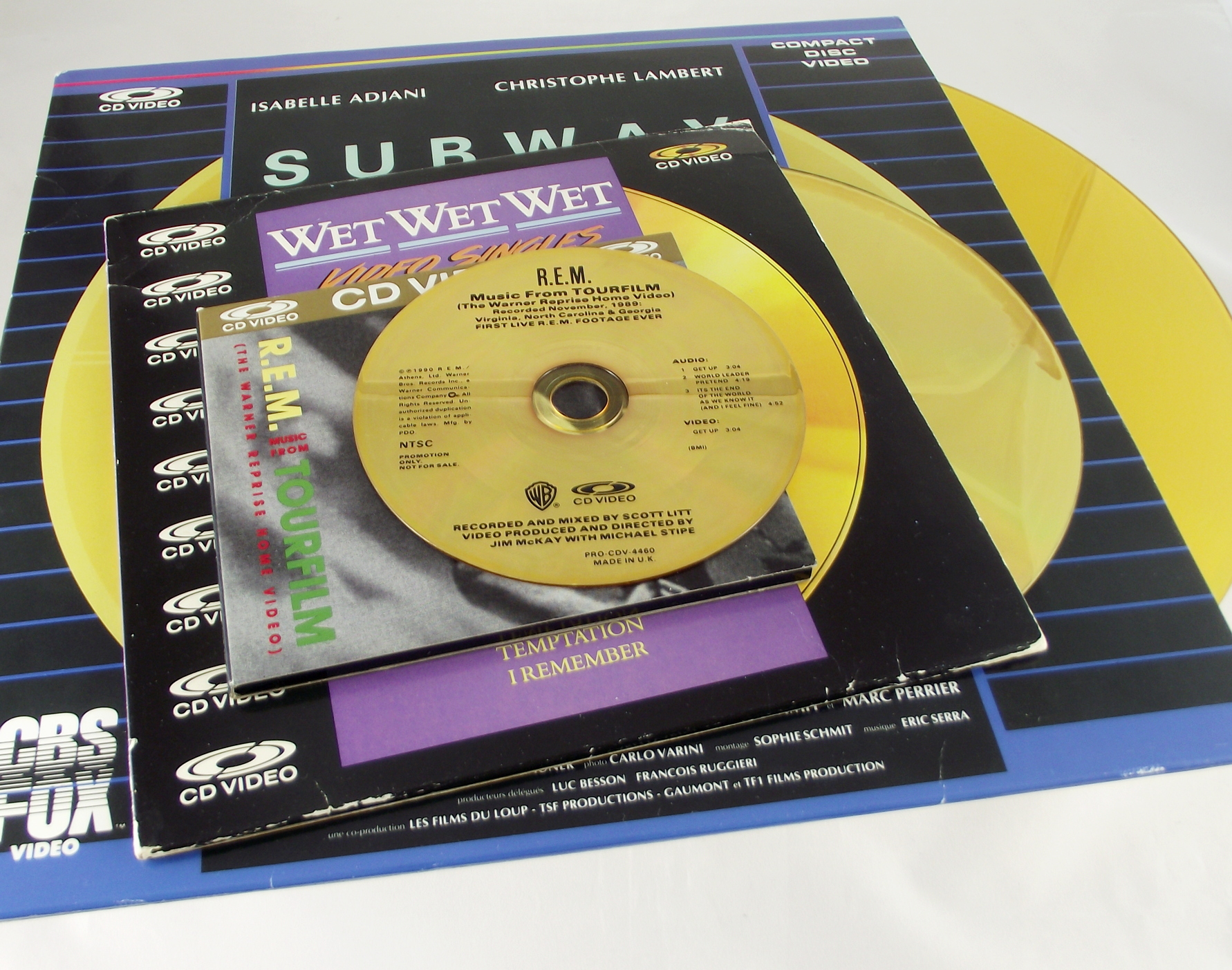
12 cm, 20 cm and 30 cm "CD-Video" discs. Despite the name, only the smallest contains CD-compatible content. The larger two are effectively Laserdiscs with a digital soundtrack.

=== 12 cm "CD Video" disc format ===
One of the first LaserDisc players that can play CD-V discs is the Pioneer CLD-1010 from 1987. Though it is a CD-based format, CD Video was never given a rainbow book designation; the idea of encoding analog video, which is incompatible between different regions, was poorly received by CD stakeholders other than Philips, who had not consulted them prior to demonstrating the format to the music industry.

CD Video discs have a distinctive gold color, to differentiate them from regular silver-colored audio CDs. This is a characteristic that would later be replicated in HVD, a more advanced disc format.

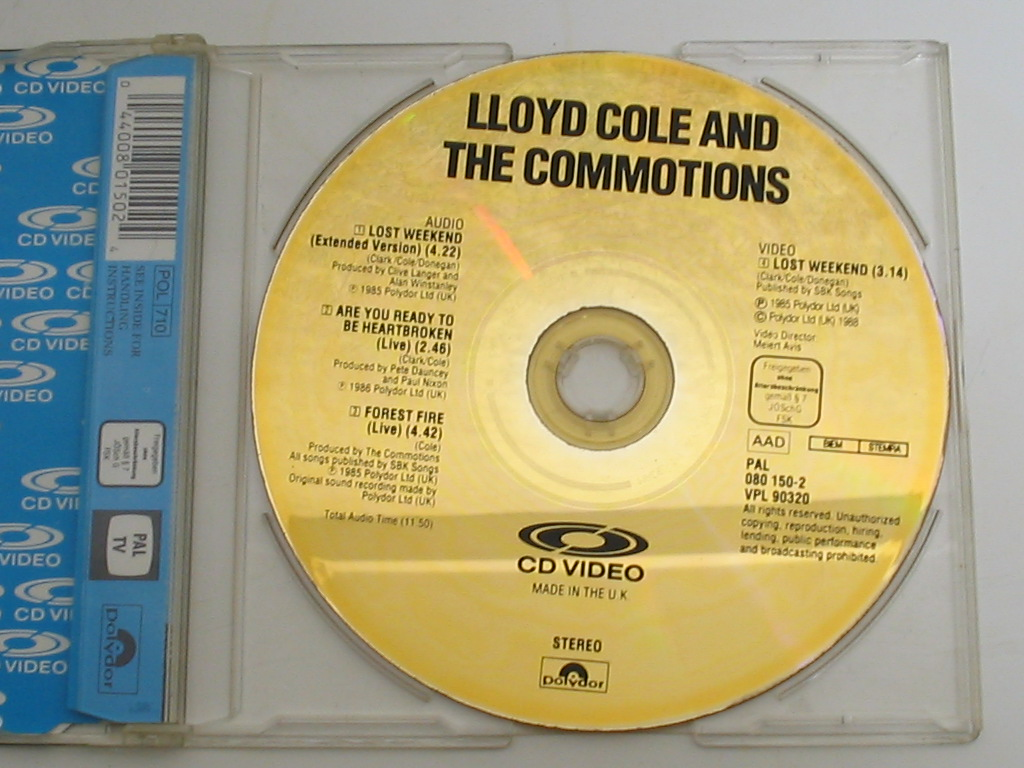
A typical 12 cm CD Video release in its case. This contains three audio tracks and one video by the band Lloyd Cole and the Commotions.

The physical size of the 12 cm (4.7 in) discs limited the amount of LaserDisc content to around six minutes, which meant they were primarily suited to pop music videos. However, both players and discs were too expensive for the youth market likely to be most interested in such content.

=== Other uses of the name ===
==== "CD Video" branding on 20 and 30 cm LaserDiscs ====
The "CD Video" name and logo were also used to market some full-size 30 cm (12 in) and EP-sized 20 cm (7.9 in) LaserDiscs that featured a digital (rather than analog) soundtrack and the same gold colouring.

Unlike the newly launched 12 cm (4.7 in) discs, these were little more than a rebrand of existing LaserDisc formats. (Both disc sizes, along with support for digital soundtracks, had been in use for several years before CD Video launched.) In addition, despite the name, they did not feature CD-compatible content as the smaller discs did.

==== European LaserDisc relaunch ====
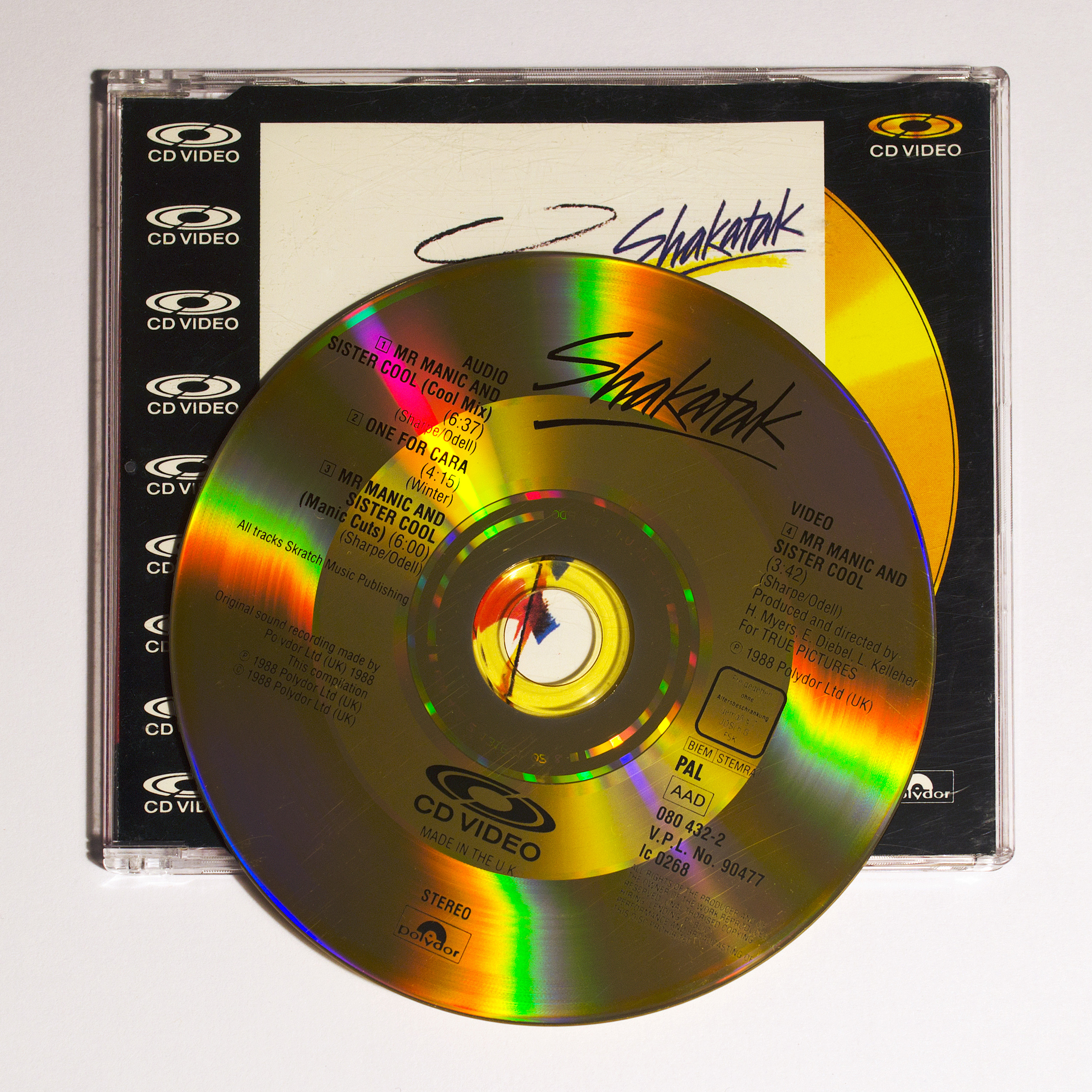
CD Video showing refraction patterns which vary between the regions holding CD audio (inside) and LaserDisc (outside)

Philips' launch of the CD Video format (and the rebranding of existing LaserDisc formats under the name) also served as the basis of a relaunch for LaserDisc as a whole in Europe where sales under the original "LaserVision" name had been extremely poor, and Philips attempted to leverage the name recognition of the newly successful audio CD format. Despite this, the rebranded format remained unsuccessful in Europe.

The use of digital audio on the relaunched "CD Video"-branded LaserDiscs rendered them incompatible with older analog-only "LaserVision" players made for the European PAL television standard. (PAL LaserDiscs can only support analog or uncompressed digital soundtracks, but not both.) However, at that point, Philips estimated there to have been just 12,000 to 15,000 analog-only Laservision players sold in Europe.

=== Discontinuation and legacy ===
CD Video lasted only a few years in the marketplace and was already being referred to as a "failed" format by mid-1990.

A similar format called Video Single Disc (VSD) was later announced for the Japanese market in 1990. While this used the same CD-sized 12 cm format as CD Video, it contained only an analog video track and no CD-compatible audio making it, in effect, a small LaserDisc. The price of VSDs was intended to be around half that of CD Video discs.

When CD Video failed to become the success Philips was hoping for, they turned their attention to the more promising MPEG-1-based digital video compression which ultimately formed the basis of Video CD—a similarly named, but incompatible and fundamentally different (and all-digital) format launched in 1993.

== See also ==
- Video Single Disc – A similar format to 12cm CD Video discs but lacking CD-compatible audio content
