= DiscoVision =

Early analog optical videodisc format

MCA DiscoVision
- Type: Division
- Industry: Home Video
- Founded: 1978; 48 years ago
- Defunct: 1981; 45 years ago
- Fate: Discontinued
- Successor: Universal Pictures Home Entertainment
- Headquarters: Atlanta, Georgia, United States
- Parent: MCA Inc.

DiscoVision is the name of several things related to the LaserDisc video format.

It was the original name of the "Reflective Optical Videodisc System" format later known as "LaserVision" or LaserDisc.

== Description ==
MCA DiscoVision, Inc. was a division of entertainment giant MCA (Music Corporation of America), established in 1969 to develop and sell an optical videodisc system. MCA released discs pressed in Carson and Costa Mesa, California on the DiscoVision label from the format's Atlanta, Georgia launch in 1978 to 1982 and the release of the film The Four Seasons. DiscoVision titles included films from Universal Pictures, Paramount Pictures, Warner Bros. Pictures, and Disney content. Agreements were made with Columbia Pictures and United Artists, though no discs were released on the DiscoVision label from either studio. Most of these companies later established their own labels for the format, the first being Paramount with a dozen movies released on the Paramount Home Video label in the summer of 1981.

The successor to MCA DiscoVision, DiscoVision Associates (DVA), was the result of a partnership between IBM and MCA. It was hoped that the merger would provide the basis for improvement of the quality of DiscoVision pressings, but no appreciable improvement ever took hold. In 1981, responsibility for the laser videodisc was sold to Pioneer Electronic Corporation, after MCA Discovision had previously started a partnership in 1977 with Pioneer, Universal Pioneer, to produce the Pioneer PR-7820 player (the first industrial model of DiscoVision player from 1978), as well as establishing disc pressing plants in Japan. As part of the partnership, Pioneer, in association with MCA, had a disc replication facility in Kofu, Japan that produced discs. Some of the last DiscoVision label discs were manufactured by Pioneer in Japan.

In the same year, MCA discontinued their DiscoVision branding, due to the sale of the technology to Pioneer (who then rebranded the format as LaserDisc) and in turn rebranded their laserdisc releases, now fabricated by Pioneer, under the MCA Videodisc banner; this was changed to the "MCA Home Video" name for both its VHS and videodisc releases. Some of DiscoVision's technical staff went on to form MCA Video Games, in an effort to produce video game cartridges.

DiscoVision Associates later evolved into a patent holding company which manages and licenses intellectual property related to LaserDisc, Compact Disc, and optical disc technologies, as well as other non-disc related fields.

In 1989, Pioneer acquired DiscoVision Associates where it continues to license its technologies independently.

As the portfolio of patents expired, the presence of DiscoVision became less visible. However, it established the success of a patent holding company, which other companies are stimulated to generate royalty income from their own patent portfolio.
