= Index of video-related articles =

The following is a list of video-related topics.

== Numbers ==
- 3D
- 4:3
- 16:9

== A-C ==
- Academy Awards
- Adobe Premiere—real time editing
- Advanced Authoring Format AAF
- alpha channel
- Animation
- Audio commentary
- Avid—real time editing
- B-movie
- B-roll
- Betacam
- Betamax
- Blu-ray
- bluescreen/chroma key
- Bollywood
- Camcorder
- Camera
- Canopus DVStorm2—real time editing
- CCIR 601
- CCD
- Chroma subsampling—4:1:0, 4:1:1, 4:2:0, 4:2:2, 4:4:4
- Cinematography
- Clapperboard
- Closed-captioning
- Comparison of video editing software
- Component video signal
- Composite video signal
- Copy detection
- Cult film

== D-F ==
- Digital audio
- Digital cinema
- Digital cinematography
- Digital film
- Digital video
- DVd
- DVD
- D-VHS
- Entertainment law
- Film
- Film colorization
- Film criticism
- Film distribution
- Film festivals
- Film gauges
- Film genres
- Film institutes
- Filmmaking
- Film preservation
- Film production
- Film rating systems
- Film restoration
- Film styles
- Film technique
- Film theory
- Film trailer
- Final Cut Pro—real time editing
- filter
- FORscene—video logging, editing, publishing and hosting
- Full screen
- FX

== G-J ==
- Hammer Horror
- HDV
- HDTV
- History of cinema
- Hollywood
- IMAX
- Independent film
- Infrared filter
- Interlace

== K-M ==
- Keyframe
- Kollywood
- Letterbox
- Line (video)
- Linear video editing
- List of video editing software
- Video logging
- Lower thirds
- Movie
- MPEG-1
- MPEG-2
- Multiple-camera setup

== N-Q ==
- neutral density filter a.k.a. ND filter
- NHK Twinscam
- non-linear video editing
- NTSC
- PAL
- Photography

== R-T ==
- Safe area
- SECAM
- Short film
- Soundtrack
- Special effects
- Steadicam
- Super-resolution
- S-VHS
- S-Video
- Synchronization
- Tamil Film Industry
- Telecine
- Television
- time code
- Troma

== U-W ==
- Ulead MediaStudio Pro
- UV filter
- Vectorscope
- VHS
- Video CD
- Video editing
- video game
- Video production companies
- Video sharing
- Videography
- Videotape
- Waveform monitor
- Windows Media Video
- W-VHS

== X-Z ==
- YIQ
- YUV

== See also ==
- Outline of film
- Photo slideshow software
- Video editing software
