= AFM =

AFM may refer to:

== Military ==
- Air Force Medal, awarded in the British Royal Air Force
- United States Air Force Memorial, in Arlington, Virginia
- Armed Forces of Malta, the name given to the combined armed services of Malta
- Republic of China Armed Forces Museum, a museum in Taipei, Taiwan

== Organizations ==
=== Businesses ===
- AFM Records, a German record label
- Alex von Falkenhausen Motorenbau, a German racing car constructor
- American Freedom Mortgage, Inc., a corporation based in Georgia, US

=== Governmental organizations ===
- Autoriteit Financiële Markten, Netherlands financial markets regulator
- Armed Forces of Malta, the name given to the combined armed services of Malta

=== Non-profit, non-governmental organizations ===
- Africa Fighting Malaria, a health campaign in Africa
- American Federation of Motorcyclists, a road racing club
- American Federation of Musicians, a labour union in North America
- Apostolic Faith Mission of South Africa, a Pentecostal Christian denomination
- Australia First Movement, an Australian fascist organization during the Second World War
- Macau Football Association, the governing body of football in Macau

== Science and technology ==
- AFM (gene), in biochemistry, a member of the albumin gene family that encodes the protein Afamin
- Abrasive flow machining, a technique for smoothing internal part surfaces
- Active Fuel Management (formerly "Displacement on Demand"), a trademarked name for the automobile variable displacement technology from General Motors
- Acute flaccid myelitis, a neurologic disease similar to polio
- Adobe Font Metrics, a computer file format
- Air flow meter, a device that measures how much air is flowing through a tube
- AFm phases, or "Alumina, Ferric oxide, monosulfate" phases, in cement chemistry
- Antiferromagnetism, a material property and type of magnetic ordering
- Atomic force microscopy, a high-resolution type of scanning probe microscopy
- Audio Frequency Modulation, an audio recording standard
- Aircraft flight manual, a book containing information required to operate an aircraft

== Other uses ==
- American Film Market, an annual event for the financing of film production and distribution
- Annals of the Four Masters, a chronicle of medieval Irish history
- Aquarium Fish Magazine, a North American monthly magazine
- Artificial financial market, an approach in finance and economics to dealing with heterogeneity
