= Robin Powell =

English broadcast journalist

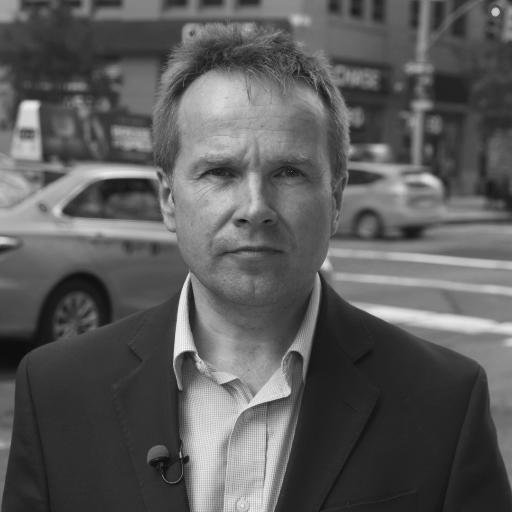
Robin Powell

Robin Powell is an English broadcast journalist and founder of Ember Television and Regis Media.

== Education ==
Powell was educated at Repton School, a boarding independent school for boys (now co-educational), followed by Christ Church at the University of Oxford. During his time at Oxford, Powell was an intern with NBC News in New Orleans and the Democratic Party in Washington, D.C.

== Life and career ==
In 1991, Powell began his career in broadcast journalism working as a journalist for ITV Central, ITV News and ITV Sport. He spent 14 years with the network and seven years as a freelance reporter for Sky News and The Politics Show on BBC1. He reported from locations including Baghdad, Soweto and Guantanamo Bay, and made award-winning documentaries on the Holocaust and on Britain's Romani community.

He founded the Birmingham-based corporate video production company Ember Television in 2010 and has developed a specialist expertise in content marketing for the financial services sector. He works as a brand journalist and content marketing consultant for advisers in Europe, North America and Australasia.
