= Corporate film =

Non-advertisement video made for a business

Corporate film refers to any type of non-advertisement based film/video content created for and commissioned by a business, company, corporation, or organization. Today, the vast majority of corporate film content is hosted online and is published on the company’s website page and distributed through social media or email marketing.

Corporate video content is targeted towards that company’s core selling demographics or internal employees. Corporate video production is frequently the responsibility of a marketing director or corporate communications manager. Examples of corporate video include corporate overview videos, staff training and safety videos, promotional/brand films, investor relations and shareholder videos, market updates, product videos, event videos, onboarding videos, employer branding videos, CEO statements, executive proposal videos, and customer testimonial videos.

As video becomes a more integral part of a company’s communication strategy, often companies will release corporate videos with press release announcements, newsletters and other forms of communication to bolster the message reach and effectiveness.

Corporate Film Production companies leverage a company’s marketing material, guidance from their communication director, and content specific copy to produce a corporate video. The time and scale of a corporate video production can vary greatly based on complexity and messaging. Some corporate videos may use only minimal crew and basic equipment, while others elect for higher quality content and contract with corporate video production specialists whose core focus is on creating B2B corporate video content.

Video content has become a significant ranking factor for search engine optimization from search engines such as Google, Yahoo and Bing and as a result more companies are electing to create corporate video content for their websites.

== Types and usage ==
- Staff training / instruction and safety videos
- Employer Branding Videos
- Onboarding Videos
- CEO statements
- Event Videos
- Investor relations / financial results
- Company promotional/brand videos
- New product or service online presentations
- Product features and benefits explainer video
- Video role play (often with actors)
- Client and customer testimonial videos
- Event Videos
- Trade show coverage
- Corporate event filming (for example, a new product launch or conference)
- Live and on-demand webcasting
- Technology and product demonstration videos
- Business television

== See also ==
- List of video topics
- Filmmaking
- Video Production
- Television
- Video production companies
- Corporate communications
- Marketing
