= S-VHS =

Improved version of VHS

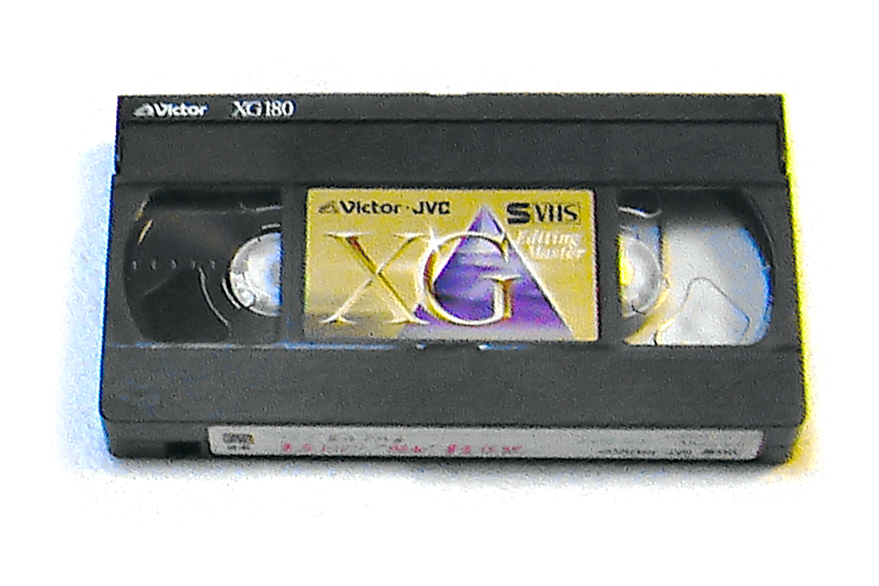
- An S-VHS tape
- Media type: Magnetic tape cassette
- Encoding: PAL, NTSC, ADAT
- Capacity: 9 hours in super long play (SLP) mode on a T-180 tape, 10 hours in PAL-LP mode on an E-300 tape (up to 15 hours in PAL-EP mode)
- Standard: 525 lines, 625 lines
- Usage: Home video, home movies, video production
- Extended from: VHS
- Extended to: D-VHS; W-VHS
- Released: April 1987; 39 years ago

Super VHS, commonly abbreviated as S-VHS, is an analog videocassette format introduced by JVC in 1987 as an enhanced variant of the Video Home System (VHS) format. S-VHS improved image quality by increasing the bandwidth of the luminance (brightness) signal; this allowed for an image resolution of approximately 400 horizontal lines, compared to the 240 lines typical of VHS. The S-VHS format used the same physical cassette shell as VHS, but it required higher-grade magnetic tape, as well as compatible recording and playback equipment.

S-VHS decks are backward compatible with standard VHS tapes, allowing these decks to play and record in VHS format. However, S-VHS tapes generally cannot be played in VHS-only machines, due to differences in signal encoding.

Despite its technical advantages, S-VHS struggled to gain widespread consumer adoption because of the higher cost of equipment and tapes, along with the limited availability of prerecorded content. The format found moderate success in professional, educational, and industrial applications—including video production, surveillance camera recording, and television broadcasting—where its higher resolution and compatibility with VHS tapes made it a practical transitional format.

== Technical information ==
Like the VHS format, S-VHS uses a color under A modulation scheme. S-VHS improves luminance (luma) resolution by increasing luminance bandwidth. Increased bandwidth is possible because of the increased luminance carrier from 3.4 megahertz (MHz) to 5.4 MHz. The luminance modulator bandwidth is also increased: in contrast to standard VHS's frequencies of 3.8 MHz (sync tip) to 4.8 MHz (peak white), S-VHS uses 5.4 MHz sync tip and 7.0 MHz peak white. Increased luminance bandwidth produces a 60% improvement in luminance picture detail—a horizontal resolution of 420 vertical lines per picture height, versus VHS's 240 lines. The horizontal resolution of "over 400" means that S-VHS captures greater picture detail than NTSC analog cable and broadcast television, which is limited to about 330 television lines (TVL). It has been reported that differences between live television and an S-VHS recording are detectable because S-VHS does not improve other key aspects of the video signal, particularly the chrominance (chroma) signal. In VHS, the chroma carrier is both severely bandlimited and noisy, a limitation that S-VHS does not address. The lack of color resolution was a deficiency shared by S-VHS's contemporaries, such as Hi8 and ED-Beta—all of which were limited to 0.4 megahertz (or 30 TVL) resolution.

In audio recording, S-VHS retains VHS's conventional linear (baseband) and high fidelity (hi-fi; Audio Frequency Modulation [AFM]) soundtracks. Some professional S-VHS decks and high-end domestic S-VHS VCRs (such as the Victor HR-Z1) can additionally record a pulse-code modulation (PCM) digital audio track (stereo 48 kHz) onto S-VHS tape, along with normal video and hi-fi stereo and mono analog audio.

This recording is performed by using a high carrier frequency of 3 MHz for the digital audio, with O-QDPSK (offset quadrature differential phase-shift keying) modulation and PCM encoding; this is then recorded onto the same helical tracks as the video. This frequency is above those used for VHS hi-fi (1.7 MHz for the left channel and 1.8 MHz for the right channel) but below the luminance signal frequency for regular VHS of 3.4 MHz. The digital audio stream has a bit rate of 2.6 Mbit/s. O-QDPSK is based on QDPSK (quadrature differential phase-shift keying)—also known as DQPSK (differential quadrature phase-shift keying)—and is very similar to it, except that O-QDPSK signals are free from zero crossings; the signals never cross the 0 voltage point. Instead, they are above and below the 0 voltage point. This type of digital audio requires a bandwidth of 500 kHz. This audio channel can also have a carrier frequency of 2 MHz.

The bandwidth of S-VHS allows PAL recordings to contain teletext data along with the normal video signal, which then can be displayed as an overlay on the conventional television picture (though not on standard VHS machines). A suitably teletext-equipped receiver/decoder (television, PC card, etc.) displays the recorded teletext information as if the video were a television transmission being received at that moment.

=== Hardware ===
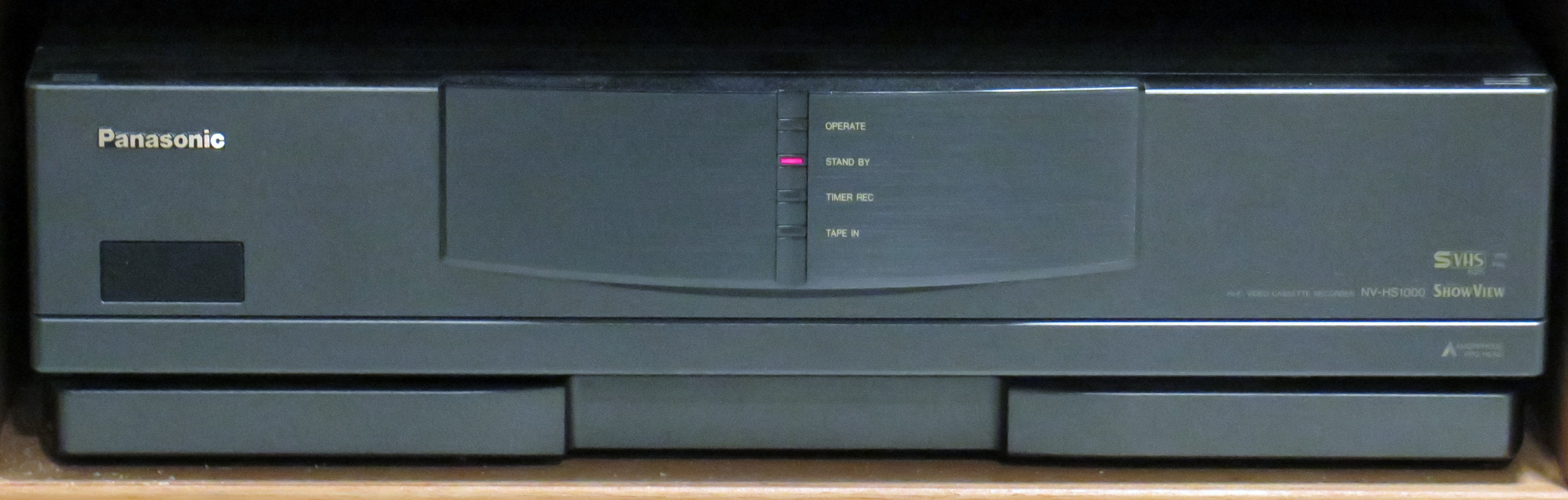
Panasonic NV-HS1000 S-VHS VCR

Videocassette recorders (VCRs) and cassette tapes for S-VHS are nearly identical in appearance and operation with VHS—as well as being backward compatible with VHS. VHS VCRs cannot play S-VHS recordings, but they can record onto an S-VHS tape in basic VHS format. Newer VHS VCRs, depending upon their specifications, offered a feature called S-VHS quasi-playback or Super Quasi-Play Back, abbreviated to SQPB. SQPB lets basic VHS players display (but not record) S-VHS recordings, though reduced to the lower VHS quality. This feature is useful for viewing S-VHS camcorder recordings that use either full-sized S-VHS cassettes or smaller S-VHS-C cassettes.

Later-model S-VHS VCRs offer a recording option called S-VHS ET, which allows S-VHS VCRs to record on VHS tape. S-VHS ET is a further modification of VHS standards that permits near S-VHS quality recordings on more common and less expensive basic VHS tapes. S-VHS ET recordings can be viewed on most SQPB-equipped VHS VCRs and S-VHS VCRs.

To benefit most from S-VHS, a direct video connection to the monitor or television is required, ideally via an S-Video connector and/or S-Video-enabled SCART.

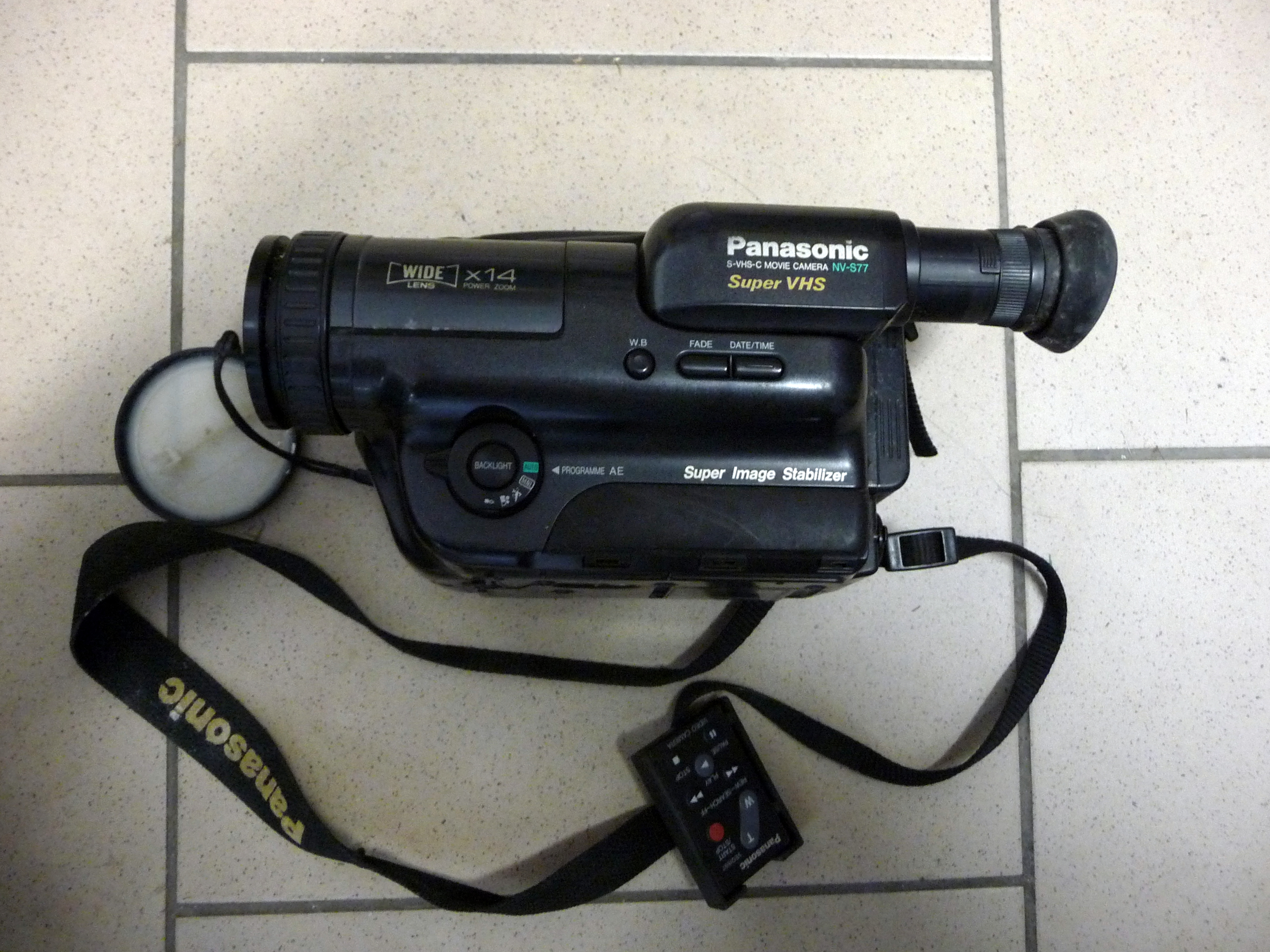
Video recorder Super VHS-C Panasonic NV-S77

=== Media ===
In order to take advantage of the enhanced capabilities of the S-VHS system, an S-VHS VCR requires S-VHS videotape cassettes. These have a different oxide media formulation than VHS for higher magnetic coercivity. S-VHS videocassettes are sensed and identified by the videocassette recorder via a specific internal profile within a hole on the underside of the S-VHS videocassette body.

Videophiles were the first to propose the following theory: since the only distinguishing feature of an S-VHS tape is a small 3 mm hole on the underside of the videocassette, it should be possible to use more common and inexpensive VHS tapes by duplicating that hole. However, S-VHS cassettes contain a higher grade and coercivity of tape stock to effectively record the higher video bandwidth offered by S-VHS.

S-VHS tapes can be used with VHS VCRs, but an S-VHS recording suffers from video fidelity issues on a VHS VCR without SQPB.

=== S-VHS ET ===
JVC introduced an S-VHS ET (Super VHS Expansion Technology) system on its S-VHS consumer decks. This system allowed the use of normal VHS tapes for S-VHS recording by slightly modifying the S-VHS recording specs but still retaining compatibility, so that S-VHS ET tapes could be played with non-ET S-VHS VCRs. In S-VHS ET mode, the recording circuit is altered with the following changes:

1. The W/D clip level (reducing the white clip level from 210% in S-VHS to 190% in S-VHS ET)
2. The main emphasis characteristics (changing the frequency responses)
3. The recording level (Y and C) and recording current

== Use for digital audio ==
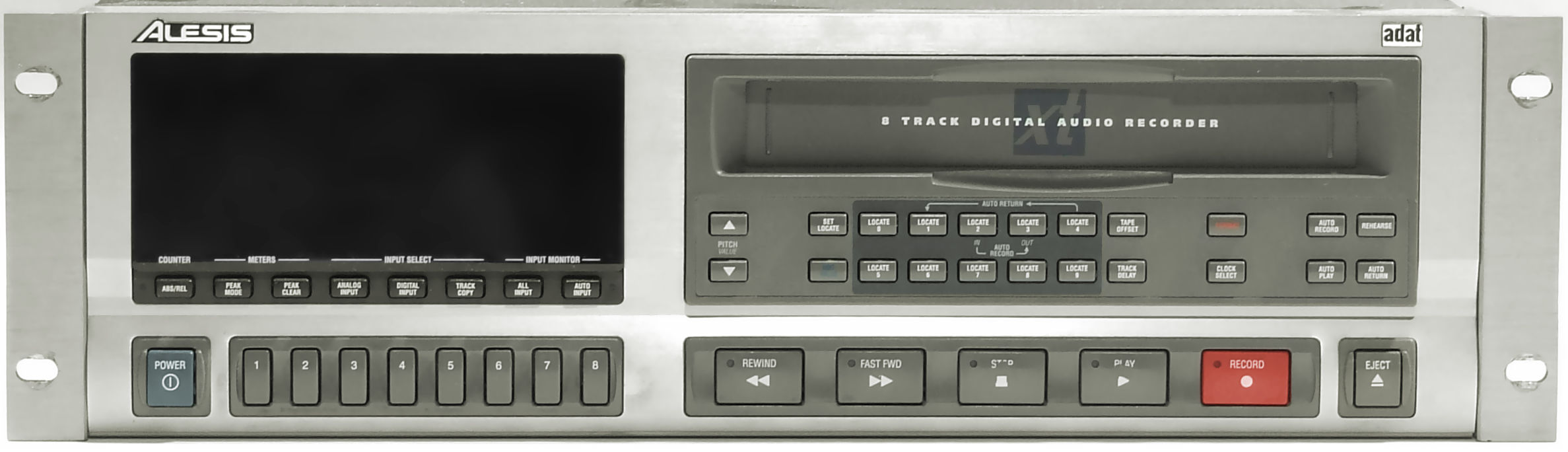
An Alesis ADAT XT 8-channel digital audio recorder

In 1991, Alesis introduced Alesis Digital Audio Tape (ADAT), an eight-track digital audio recording system that used S-VHS cassettes. An ADAT machine recorded eight tracks of uncompressed audio material in 16-bit (later 20-bit) resolution. The recording time was one-third of the cassette's nominal playing time, e.g., a 120-minute S-VHS cassette held 40 minutes of eight-track audio.

Studer produced the V-Eight (manufactured and sold by Alesis as the M20) and the V-Twenty-Four digital multitrack recorders. These used S-VHS cassettes for 8- and 24-track digital audio recording, at a significantly lower cost than their Digital Audio Stationary Head (DASH) reel-to-reel digital recorders. The recorders' videotape transports were made for Studer by the company Matsushita.

== See also ==
- D-VHS
- W-VHS
- Video 2000
- Betamax
