= W-VHS =

Analog HDTV recording format on VHS tapes

- Media type: Magnetic tape cassette
- Encoding: 1125-line or 525-line
- Developed by: JVC
- Usage: Home movies, Home video, Video production
- Extended from: S-VHS
- Released: 1993; 33 years ago

W-VHS (Wide-VHS) is an HDTV-capable analog recording videocassette format created by JVC. The format was originally introduced on January 8, 1993 for use with Japan's Hi-Vision (a.k.a. MUSE), an early analog high-definition television system. The first W-VHS recorder was the Victor (JVC) HR-W1, released on December 28, 1993.

== Naming ==
The Japanese language uses "W", as an ideogram meaning "double", the original Japanese name of the system refers to a doubling of resolution seen on W-VHS system.

By the time the system was being prepared for a western market, JVC had retrofitted the "W" name as "Wide-VHS" and coined four marketing points based on the "Wide" moniker.

- Wide aspect ratio
- Worldwide-usable format, conforming to foreign HDTV systems
- Wide development of videotape applications
- Wide (two-track) recording system

== Mechanism ==
W-VHS VCRs can record a high-definition video signal (stored internally as an 1125-line signal similar to Hi-Vision) via the analog YPbPr component interface, a standard-definition signal (525-line), or two simultaneous standard-definition signals, for 3D video.

The recording medium of W-VHS is a 1/2-inch double-coated metal particle tape stored in a cartridge similar to VHS. Some W-VHS VCRs are capable of playing and recording VHS and S-VHS media.

Unlike normal VHS, which uses a single head to record video fields as a series of parallel standalone tracks, W-VHS uses a dual-head design to record each video field as two parallel tracks storing a component video signal. The signal is recorded using a method called "time compression integration" in which the luminance signal is divided into two sets of lines, which are then split and recorded across both tracks. After the luminance signals are recorded, the two color signals are recorded, one on each track, in a time-compressed form. Recording these signals sequentially rather than side by side prevents crosstalk between the luma and chroma components.

Because the video signals are recorded in component form instead of e.g. the "color-under" method used by S-VHS, standard-definition image quality for W-VHS is typically much higher, due to the lack of noise caused by a chroma sub-carrier. Audio is stored as a digital PCM stream.

W-VHS decks could have up to 12 heads in the head drum, of which 11 were active and one was a dummy used for balancing the head drum.

== Use ==
Due to its high cost, W-VHS equipment and media was distributed in the United States through JVC's professional video and broadcast equipment division and was primarily marketed for industrial and commercial applications such as medical imaging.

Currently, it is very difficult to find either W-VHS VCRs or tapes. If W-VHS media is not available, JVC recommends the use of tapes intended for the D-9 or Digital-S digital video format.

The running time between W-VHS and Digital-S is not the same; a Digital-S tape with a length of 64 min is approximately 105 min when used with W-VHS.

== See also ==
- D-VHS
- S-VHS
- Blu-ray Disc
