= National Military Museum (Taiwan) =

Museum in Zhongshan, Taipei, Taiwan

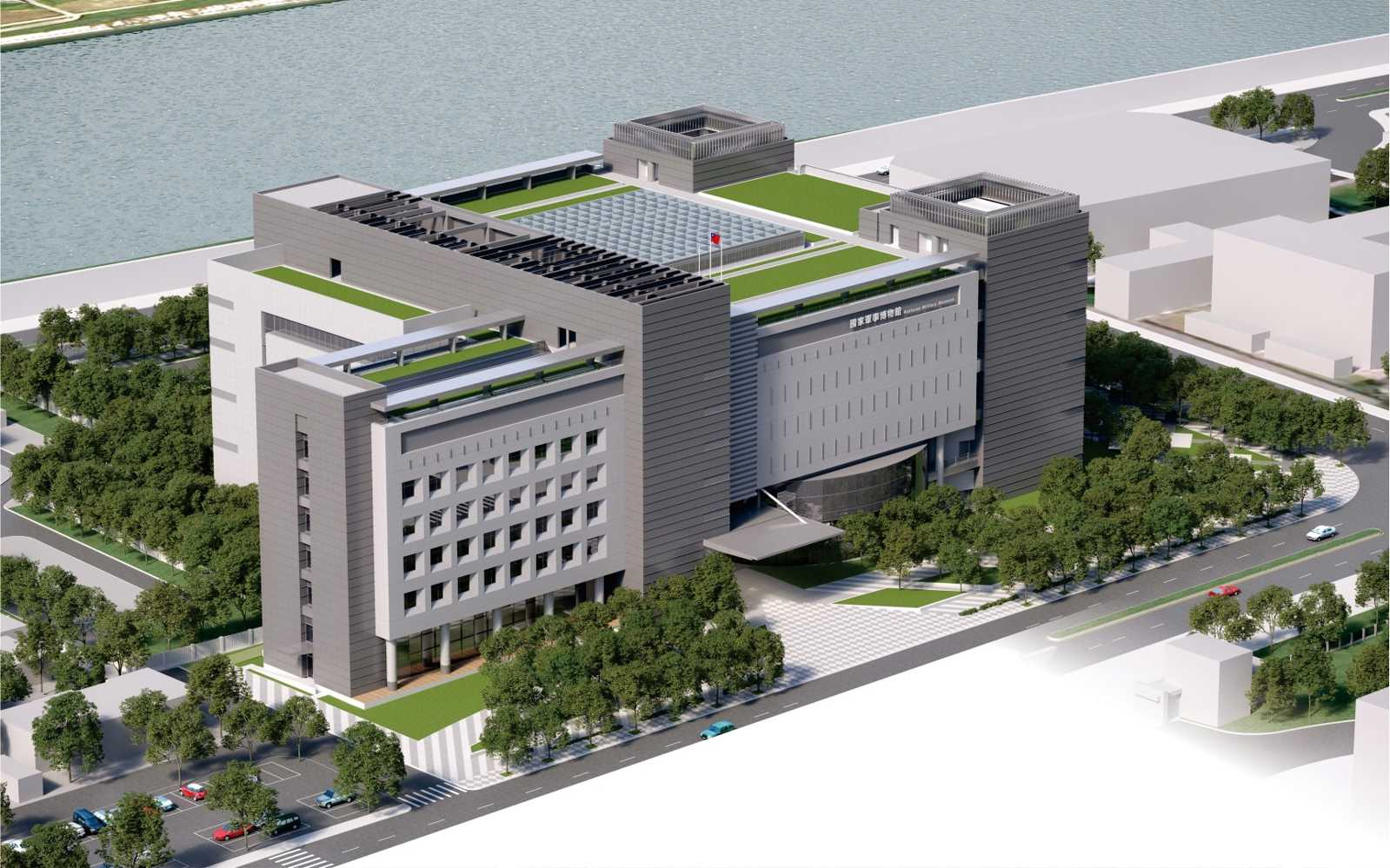
An illustration of the planned Republic of China National Military Museum.

The National Military Museum is a museum currently under construction in Taiwan that will display the history of the Republic of China Armed Forces. The museum was announced during the Ma Ying-jeou administration in 2015 and is expected to be completed in August 2027.

The museum is being built on a site in Taipei's Zhongshan District and will replace the Republic of China Armed Forces Museum which was closed in 2021.

The museum will display the history of the Republic of China Armed Forces and the history of foreign powers competing for influence in Taiwan.
