= Sony HDVS =

Analog high definition video equipment

HDVS logo
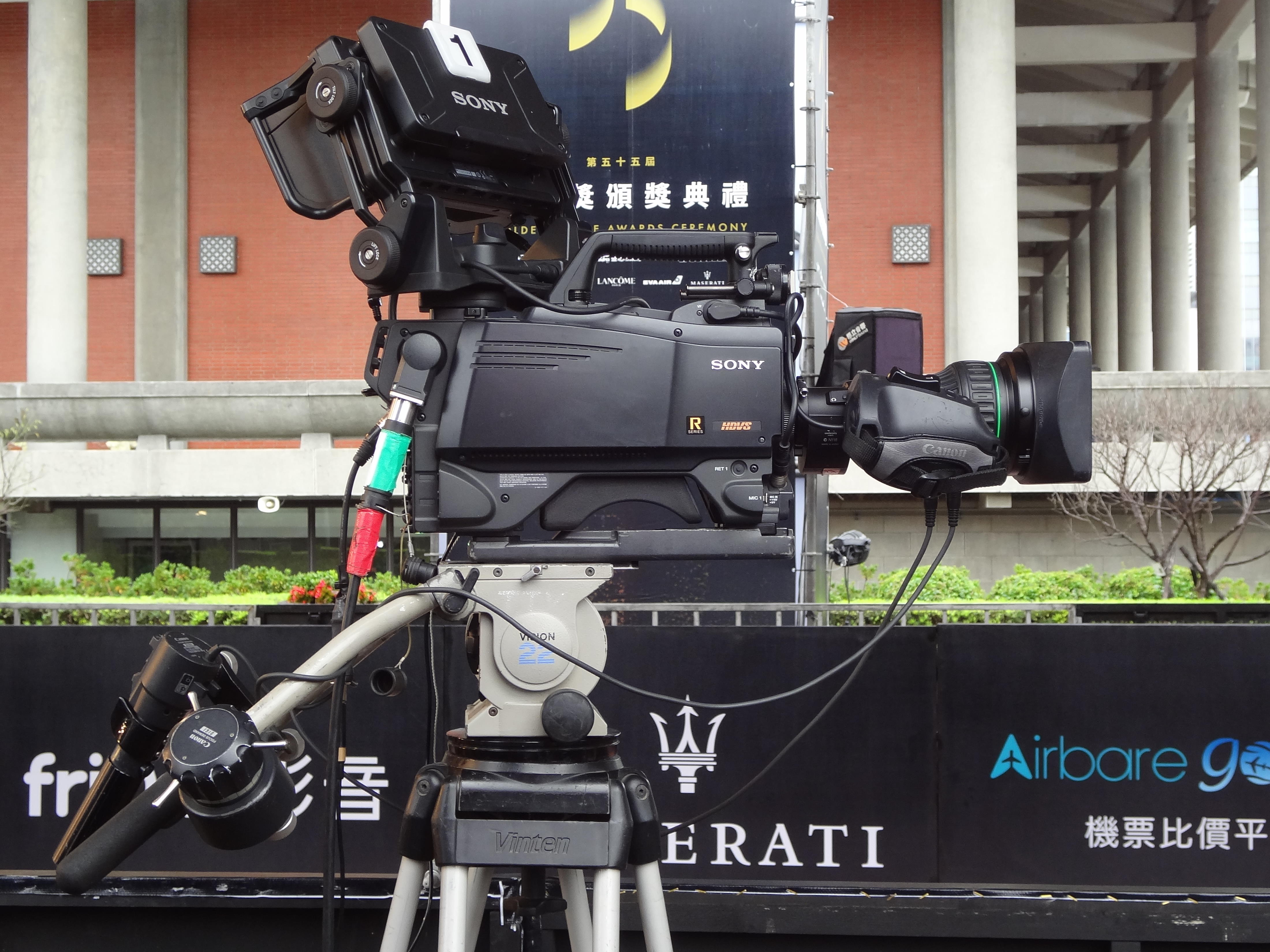
Sony camcorder with HDVS logo on it

Sony HDVS (High-Definition Video System) is a range of high-definition video equipment developed in the 1980s to support the Japanese Hi-Vision standard, an early analog high-definition television system. The range included professional video cameras, video monitors and linear video editing systems.

== History ==
Sony first demonstrated a wideband analog video HDTV capable video camera, monitor and video tape recorder (VTR) in April 1981 at an international meeting of television engineers in Algiers, Algeria.

The HDVS range was launched in April 1984, with the HDC-100 camera, which was the world's first commercially available HDTV camera and HDV-1000 video recorder, with its companion HDT-1000 processor/TBC, and HDS-1000 video switcher all working in the 1125-line component video format with interlaced video and a 5:3 aspect ratio. The first system consisting of a monitor, camera and VTR was sold by Sony in 1985 for $1.5 million, and the first HDTV production studio, Captain Video, was opened in Paris.

The helical scan VTR (the HDV-100) used magnetic tape similar to 1" type C videotape for analog recording. Sony in 1988 unveiled a new HDVS digital line, including a reel-to-reel digital recording VTR (the HDD-1000) that used digital signals between the machines for dubbing but the primary I/O remained analog signals. The Sony HDVS HDC-300 camera was also introduced. The large HDD-1000 unit was housed in a 1-inch reel-to-reel transport, and because of the high tape speed needed, had a limit of 1-hour per reel. By this time, the aspect ratio of the system had been changed to 16:9. Sony, owner of Columbia Pictures/Tri-Star, would start to archive feature films on this format, requiring an average of two reels per movie. There was also a portable videocassette recorder (the HDV-10) for the HDVS system, using the "UniHi" format of videocassette using 1/2" wide tape. The tape housing is similar in appearance to Sony's D1/D2 Standard Definition Digital VTRs, but recorded analog HD. The small cassette size limited recording time to about 63 min.

The price of the HDD-1000 and its required companion HDDP-1000 video processor in 1988 was US$600,000. The metal evaporate tape (tape whose magnetic material was evaporated and deposited onto the tape in a vacuum chamber using physical vapor deposition) cost US$2500.00 per hour of tape and each reel weighed nearly 10 pounds. The high price of the system limited its adoption severely, selling just several dozen systems and making its adoption largely limited to medical, aerospace engineering, and animation applications. In 1986, HDVS systems cost $1.5 million, and 30-40 were sold until then. Sony HDVS systems made video with a total of 1125 (horizontal) lines, and 1035 active lines of resolution.

The Sony HDL-5800 had a price of over 56,000 US dollars

== Uses ==
The Sony HDVS system was used in the production of a short film about Halley's Comet in 1986, titled "Arrival", which was shown in US theatres later that year after being transferred to 35mm film.

The first drama film shot using the HDVS professional video camera was RAI's Julia and Julia (Italian: Giulia e Giulia) in 1987, and the first HDTV television show was CBC's Chasing Rainbows, shot using the HDVS system in 1988. For the Genesis Invisible Touch Tour shows at Wembley Stadium in July 1987, the Sony HDVS system was used to film these shows, which were later released on VHS and LaserDisc in 1988 and DVD in 2003.

Montreux Jazz Festival in 1991 was recorded using the Sony HDVS video system. Four HDC-300 cameras in 1125-line format (1035i visible, close to 1080i today), 60 fps, and one Sony HDC-500 3 CCD prototype HDVS camera were used. The five cameras were connected to a 7-input HDS-1000T switcher and the live mix was recorded to an HDD-1000 Digital 1" VTR.

World War II: When Lions Roared (also known as Then There Were Giants) is a 1994 TV movie, directed by Joseph Sargent, that stars John Lithgow, Michael Caine and Bob Hoskins as the three major Allied leaders. It was the first video production to be produced in the 1125-line high-definition television (HDTV) format. It was converted to NTSC for broadcast in the United States.

The HDVS brand and logo was still used by Sony since 1997 as "Digital HDVS" on their digital high-definition HDCAM-format cameras such as the HDW-750, HDW-F900, HDC-1550, "Power HAD" camera Sony HSC-300 Series, and XDCAM camera PDW-850, PXW-X500. By 2022, HDVS branded cameras have been discontinued and new camera models released don't have the HDVS logo.

== Equipment ==
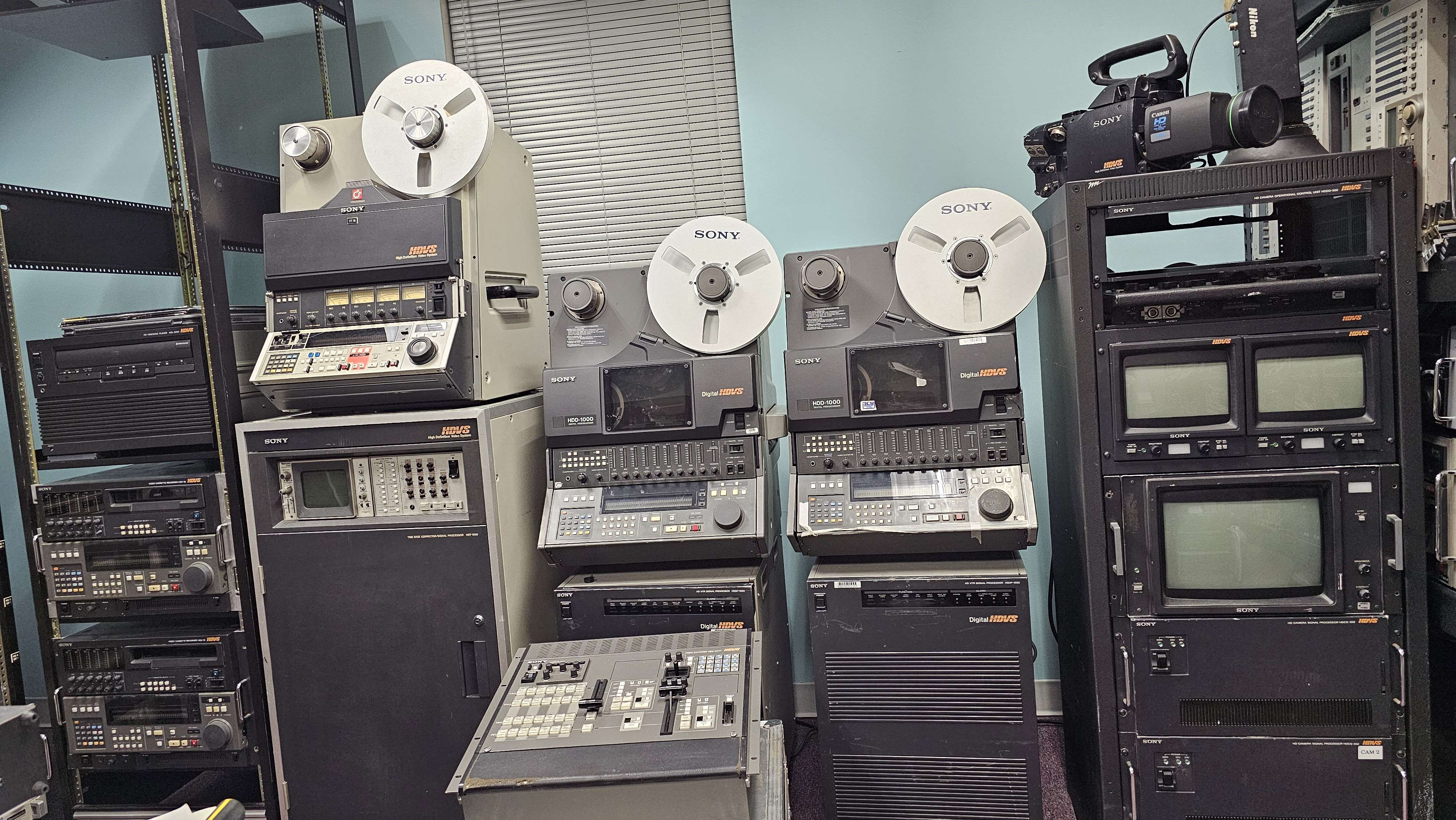
Analog Sony HDVS equipment. From left to right: HD videodisc player HDL-2000 above two HDV-10 UniHi VTRs, HDV-1000 analog reel to reel VTR with HDT-1000 processor underneath, two HDD-1000 digital reel to reel VTRs with HDDP-1000 processors underneath, HDC-500 camera above HDCO-300 camera control unit, two HDM-90 monitors, HDM-140 monitor, two HDCS-350 HD camera signal processors, HDS-1000T switcher at the bottom

=== Camera system ===
- HDC-100 High Definition Color Camera (3 tube Saticon)
- HDC-300 High Definition Color Camera (3 tube Saticon) (Sony HDVS cameras weigh 10 kilograms (22 lb) on average.)
- HDC-500 High Definition Color Camera (3 CCD, world's first CCD-based HD video camera)
- HDCA-350 Camera Adapter
- HDCA-50 Camera Adapter
- HDCO-300 Camera Operation Control Unit (CCU)
- HDCO-350 Camera Operation Control Unit (CCU)
- HDCS-300 Camera Signal Processor
- HDCS-350 Camera Signal Processor

=== Camera system/Optional accessories ===
- HDCC-2/5/50/100 Multicore Cable (2m, 5m 50m, 100m)
- HDCD-50 Signal Distributor
- HDCR-350 Remote Control Panel
- HDM-140 14 inch Monochrome monitor
- HDM-145 14 inch Monochrome monitor
- HDM-90 9-inch Monochrome monitor
- HDVF-150 1.5-inch Viewfinder
- HDVF-30 3-inch viewfinder
- HDVF-500 5-inch viewfinder
- HDVF-700 7-inch viewfinder
- HDVF-75 7-inch viewfinder
- HKCF-750 Pan Tilt Table
- HKCF-90 Rack Mount Plate Kit
- HKCH-500 Shoulder Pad

=== VTR system ===
- HDD-1000 Digital 1" Type C VTR (Wide band (30 MHz) Y, PB, PR) with BVH-3000 like operation and appearance. It used two sets of separate flying erase, record and video heads with a higher linear tape speed than Type C videotape, of 80.5 cm/sec and a writing speed at the heads of 51.5m/sec, 30 MHz luma and 15 MHz chroma bandwidth, uses HD-1D series tape
- HDDP-1000 VTR Signal Processor (8-bit digital, required by the HDD-1000 for operation)
- HDV-1000 Analog VTR (based on Sony's BVH-2000 1" Type C standard-definition VTR, unlike most Type C VTRs it used separate video and video record heads.) It had a linear tape speed of 48.31 cm/sec and a writing speed at the heads, of 25.9m/sec, 20 MHz luma and 10 MHz chroma bandwidth and a 63-min recording time with 11.75 inch tape reels, could use the same conventional tape as the BVH-2000 type C VTR.
- HDT-1000 TBC/Signal Processor (required by the HDV-1000 for operation)
- HDDF-500 Digital Frame Recorder (G, B, R)
- HDDR-1000 VTR Control Unit
- HDDR-A1000 Audio Remote Control Unit
- HDDR-V1000 Video Remote Control Unit
- HDL-2000 Videodisc Player, 20 MHz luma and 6 MHz chroma bandwidth
- HDL-5800 Video Disc Recorder, same bandwidths as the HDL-2000, 3 min record time per side of disc in CAV mode, 10 mins per side in CLV mode, and for read only (pre recorded/pressed/replicated) discs, 8 min playback time per side in CAV mode, and 15 mins per side in CLV mode. 20 MHz luma and 6 MHz chroma bandwidth. Had a price of over 50,000 US dollars and requires optical discs to be placed in a cartridge.
- HDN-22000 NTSC Down-Converter
- HDV-10 Videocassette Recorder (UNIHI), with a tape speed of 119.7mm/sec and a writing speed at the heads of 21.4m/sec with HCT-63 cassette, 20 MHz bandwidth for Y component video signal/luma, 7 MHz bandwidth for Y_{B} and Y_{R} component video signals/chroma

=== Optional accessories ===
- HCT-63 UNIHI videocassette, with 465m of 1/2 inch magnetic tape and a recording time of 63 minutes with HDV-10 recorder
- HD-1D Series High Quality Video Tape (1-inch) for use with the HDD- 1000, with metal particle formulation, similar to type C videotape, has a 63 minute record time with 11.75 inch reels holding 3,080 meters of tape
- HDIE-100 HD camera image enhancer
- HDIP-100 HD camera image enhancer power unit
- HDKF-508 Frame Memory Board (8 frames)
- HDSC-1000 Sync Converter
- HKDF-504 Frame Memory Board (4 frames)
- LBX-1000 Lightbox for use with the HDST-100T Telop Camera
- VF-503 Monitor Hood

=== Post-production equipment ===
- EBR System, Digital Electron Beam Recording (EBR) System (Video Tape to Film, Film recorder)
- HDS-1000 Switcher
- HDST-1000T Telop Camera (Saticon)

Optical Fiber Transmission System (G/B/R analog component video (signals for Green, Blue and Red portions of images with Green for sync, a kind of RGB (component) video Analog audio x2; AES/EBU x6)

- HDFR-300 Optical Fiber Receiver
- HDFT-300 Optical Fiber Transmitter

=== Projection system ===
- HDI-120 Concave Screen-Type Projector System
- HDIH-1200/1200M High Definition Projector
- HDIH-2000/2000M High Definition Projector
- HDIH-3000/3000M High Definition Projector
- HDIR-550 High Definition Rear Projector
- HDIS-1200RK Rear Projection

=== Color monitors ===
- HDM-1220/1220E 12" Color monitor
- HDM-1230/1230E 12" Color monitor
- HDM-1730/1730E 17" Color monitor
- HDM-1820/1820E 18" Color monitor
- HDM-2820/2820E 28" Color monitor
- HDM-2830/2830E 28" Color monitor
- HDM-3720/3720E 37" Color monitor
- HDM-3830/3830E 38" Color monitor
