= D-VHS =

Magnetic tape-based format meant for the distribution of digital HD movies

- Media type: Magnetic cassette tape
- Encoding: NTSC, PAL, SECAM, ADAT
- Capacity: 50 GB
- Read mechanism: Helical scan
- Write mechanism: Helical scan
- Developed by: Hitachi, JVC, Matsushita, Philips
- Usage: Home movies, Television production
- Extended from: S-VHS
- Released: December 1997; 28 years ago

D-VHS (short for Digital VHS) is a digital video recording format developed by JVC in collaboration with Hitachi, Matsushita, and Philips. Introduced in December 1997, it was designed to record digital video, including high-definition content, using the same higher-grade tapes as S-VHS (Super VHS), which could accommodate the increased data rates required by the format.

Unlike analog-based VHS and S-VHS, D-VHS records video digitally using MPEG-2 compression and stores it in an MPEG transport stream, a format also used in DVDs and digital television broadcasts. The format was standardized by the International Electrotechnical Commission as IEC 60774-5.

JVC also developed D-Theater, a proprietary variant of D-VHS used for pre-recorded high-definition movies. D-Theater tapes featured studio-released content in 720p or 1080i resolution, offering a home viewing experience similar to early Blu-ray and HD DVD formats. However, the system required compatible D-VHS players and included copy protection, which limited its adoption.

== Design ==
As a final effort for VHS, the D-VHS system had significant advantages as a highly versatile domestic recorder (the other tape-based formats are DV and Digital8, which never gained any traction except as camcorder media); however, given the wholesale move to DVD and then hard disk drive (HDD) recording, the format failed to make any headway into the video market.

Existing tape media is bulky and more expensive than hard drives. Although cable companies are gradually switching to the H.264 codec, this should not be an issue for D-VHS units since they can act purely as data stores (like a hard drive but using tape instead), and thereby pass the previously recorded H.264 data directly to the Set-top Box or TV (via i.Link/FireWire). Another alternative is a lengthy transfer to a computer for viewing. Finally, since machines are no longer manufactured, maintenance of current recorders may prove difficult.

D-VHS's primary advantage is that it is still the best way to archive encrypted high definition material from cable programming in the US. Cable, satellite companies, TiVo, and PCs equipped with cable card tuners all offered high-definition digital video recorders; however, archival has proven to be an obstacle, as proprietary boxes have restrictions on moving encrypted content. Outside of D-VHS, only HD capture devices that use an analog conversion process, such as the Hauppauge HD PVR, have enabled removal of encrypted content off many of the above proprietary boxes. This uses an analog conversion process, producing slightly degraded but still high definition grade recordings. D-VHS, on the other hand, does not need to take advantage of this so-called "analog hole", since D-VHS makes possible a pure bit-for-bit recording with no conversion necessary. This is made possible by compliance with CCI flag values carried by the digital streams, wherein only D-VHS is allowed to digitally move recordings of content originally flagged as Copy Once from a DVR device and onto a D-VHS tape. This programming that complies with the CCI flags then marks such material on the tape such that no second generation copies can be made from the tape itself, though additional copies can still be made directly from the original DVR unit to additional tapes.

Monthly rental fees to cable, TiVo, and satellite were also less with D-VHS.

The only PAL D-VHS model sold in Europe was the JVC HM-DR10000; also sold as the Philips VR-20D, it was standard definition only. This model was not a bitstream recorder, although it did have a FireWire input. Instead it is best thought of as a digital recorder for traditional analog inputs such as domestic analog TV and digiboxes for digital broadcasts. The deck was able to record D-VHS signals onto S-VHS tapes. This made it a cost-effective source of high quality domestic recordings. The US version also allows use of cheaper S-VHS media. Pictures were noticeably superior to S-VHS and were essentially transparent when compared to an off-air source. Using the LS3 mode, approximately 17.25 hours of digital video could be stored on a S-VHS E-240. The deck's biggest shortcomings were the lack of a DV output and, perhaps more crucially, the lack of RGB input via the SCART connector. NTSC versions had component video outputs.

== Tape length and speeds ==
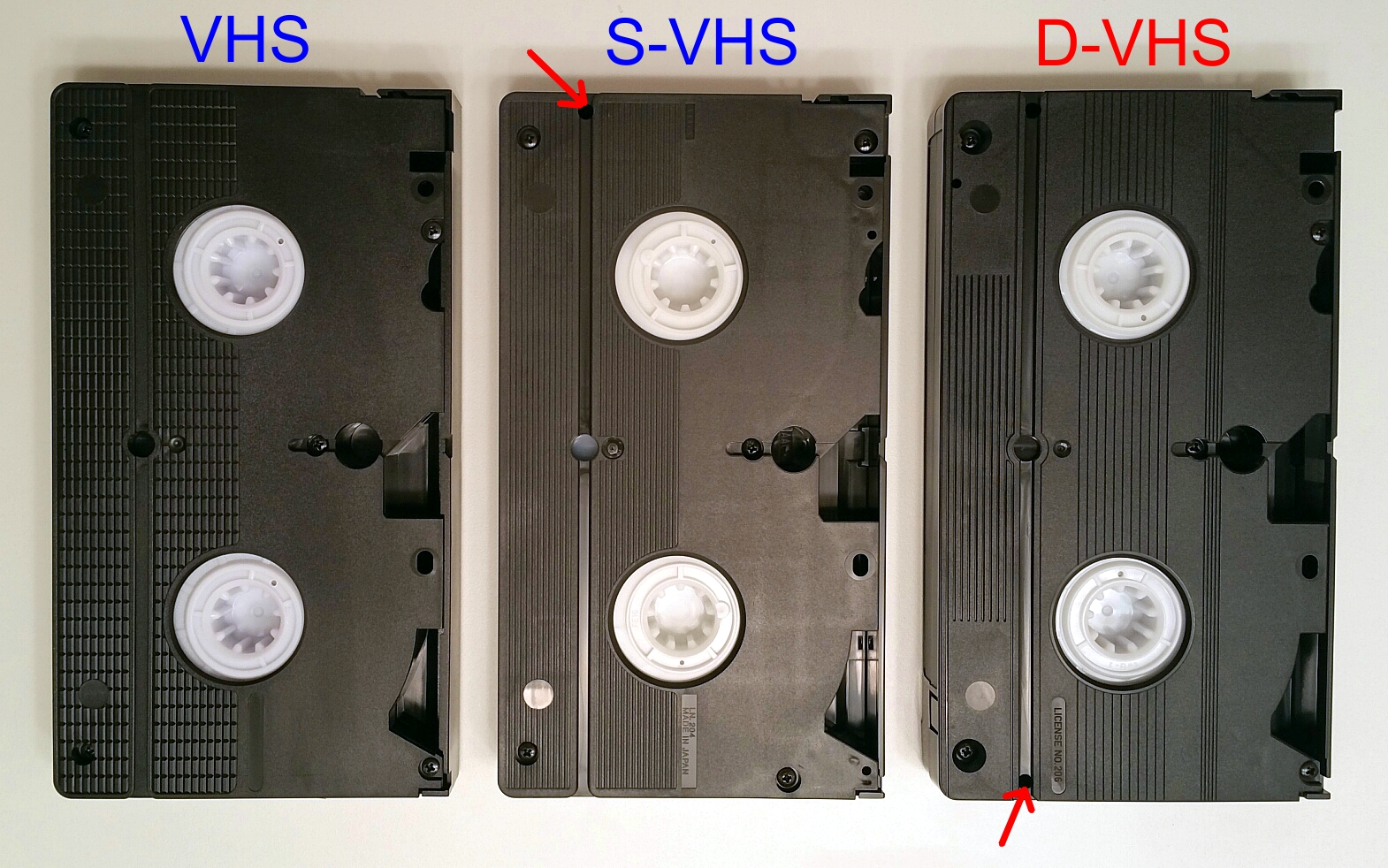
Differences between VHS, S-VHS and D-VHS cassettes

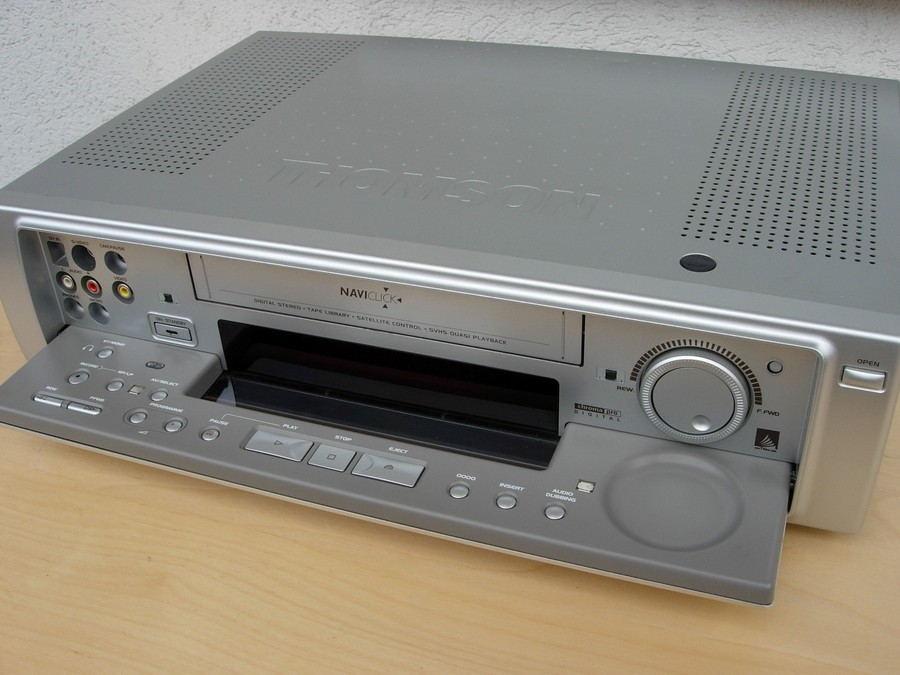
D-VHS recorder Thomson DVH-8090

D-VHS VCRs can record at multiple speeds. "HS" is "High Speed", "STD" is "Standard" and "LS" is "Low Speed"; where LS3 and LS5 represent three and five times the standard length of tape, respectively. High-definition content such as 1920x1080 or 1280x720 is typically stored at 28.2 Mbit/s (HS speed). Standard-definition content such as 720x576 (720x480) can be stored at bit rates from 14.1 Mbit/s down to 2.8 Mbit/s (STD, LS3, LS5 speeds).

The quality of STD speed is superior to the average DVD, since this speed has a much higher bitrate (approximately 14 versus 5 Mbit/s average) and suffers few compression artifacts. LS2 speed has a bitrate of 7 Mbit/s. The LS3 speed is roughly equal to an amateur DVD with some visible artifacts in high-action scenes (4.7 Mbit/s), and LS5 appears similar to a medium-quality video download (2.8 Mbit/s). JVC's HM-DH40000U and SR-VD400U were the only units to support LS5 recording.

As a result of all these different speeds, the tape labels are a bit confusing for the consumer. D-VHS was originally a standard definition format that recorded at the STD speed. When High Definition recording and HS speed was later introduced, it required twice the amount of tape. For this reason, a DF-240 will record 240 minutes of standard definition, and 240/2 = 120 minutes of high definition. When reviewing the table, note that the digital speeds HS and STD are equivalent to the older analog speeds SP and LP. There is also an additional speed called LS7.

Common D-VHS tape lengths
Label	Data storage	Length	Recording time			
Label	Data storage	Length	HS or VHS-SP	STD or VHS-LP	LS3	LS5
DF-240	25 GB	248 m (813 ft)	120 min (2 h)	240 min (4 h)	720 min (12 h)	1,200 min (20 h)
DF-300	31.7 GB	314.5 m (1,048 ft)	150 min (2:30 h)	300 min (5 h)	900 min (15 h)	1,500 min (25 h)
DF-420	44 GB	433 m (1,420 ft)	210 min (3:30 h)	420 min (7 h)	1,260 min (21 h)	2,100 min (35 h)
DF-480	50 GB	500 m (1,640 ft)	240 min (4 h)	480 min (8 h)	1,440 min (24 h)	2,400 min (40 h)

== Pre-recorded tapes ==
D-Theater logo

In 2002, pre-recorded D-VHS cassettes were sold under the brand name D-Theater in the US. While D-Theater is a D-VHS tape, it is incompatible with D-VHS decks not bearing the D-Theater logo. They provide content in both 720p and 1080i as well as at least one Dolby Digital audio track. Supported films studios include 20th Century Fox, Artisan Entertainment, DreamWorks, and Universal Pictures. D-Theater does have region code restrictions. There are three known regions; 1 for the US, 2 for Japan, and 3 for South Korea. There has never been a D-Theater video release in region 2 or 3. Region code hacks for Japanese decks have been performed to support playback of US titles. The last film available was 20th Century Fox's I, Robot. This title was a surprise to many as there were no prior announcements nor any indication that the title was available. It was originally available only on JVC's D-VHS store in late 2004; no other distributor had it, not even Fox itself. A couple of weeks later, they started trickling out to more distributors after much delay and confusion about its existence. Alien vs. Predator was announced to retailers as also being released on the same day as I, Robot, but Fox later announced that Alien vs. Predator was never shipped to retailers.

Most tapes have built-in copy protection mechanism (DTCP, also known as "5c") (copy never) that disables copying via FireWire. HDNet productions and 2929 Entertainment via Magnolia Entertainment did provide some of their original content on D-VHS but without copy protection. Many of the tapes have an introduction by owner Mark Cuban encouraging the viewer to make copies of the program in order to help distribute them.

Additional tracks may be included on D-Theater in other sound formats such as DTS. However, only the newest D-VHS players, like the JVC HM-DH40000, HM-DH5U, HM-DT100U, and Marantz MV-8300, include alternate audio track capabilities.

== Compatibility ==
There are technical issues with compatibility between recordings from Mitsubishi and JVC D-VHS decks. PAL and NTSC recordings are also incompatible.

== Adoption ==
Very few models were available to the world market and sales of this format have been weak; correspondingly, prices remained high for both VCRs and media, contributing to low demand. In 2000, Sony arranged with JVC to manufacture D-VHS VCRs under the Sony label; this marked one of the first collaborations between the two former rivals. The lack of consumer knowledge of D-VHS's advantages and capabilities as well as input limitations led to its eventual demise. The introduction of Blu-ray and HD-DVD in 2006 rendered the format abandoned.

== Similar formats ==
There has been no small-format version of D-VHS equivalent to VHS-C; JVC, the originator of the format, chose to use MiniDV for its digital camcorder lines, and since 2005 has also expanded into tapeless camcorder designs based on hard drive storage (the Everio line). JVC does market the Digital-S format for professional use; while the tapes and technology used are superficially similar to D-VHS tapes, the underlying data format is based on the DV codec and the media formulation is drastically different. Sony's MicroMV format uses the same codec as D-VHS. Therefore, D-VHS capture software can also be used to transfer MicroMV tapes.

== See also ==
- Blu-ray – Digital optical disc format
- ED Beta – Discontinued Analog video cassette recording format
- HD-DVD – Obsolete optical disc format
- HDV – Magnetic tape-based HD videocassette format for camcorders
- MicroMV – Proprietary videocassette format for camcorders
- Sony HDVS – Analog high definition video equipment
- W-VHS – Analog HDTV recording format on VHS tapes
