= Hi-Vision =

High-definition television standard

Hi-Vision (a contraction of HIgh-definition teleVISION) is the term used to refer to a high-definition television (HDTV) standard developed in Japan. It is a registered trademark of NHK Engineering Systems. The standard was never implemented outside of the country and was only available in media formats abroad.

== Overview ==
The image quality for Hi-Vision has more than twice as many scan lines as NTSC standard television broadcasting making it high-definition quality compared to standard quality. The aspect ratio of the screen is also wider at (16:9) compared to the standard (4:3).

As of 2016, there are two types of Hi-Vision broadcasting standards in Japan: digital Hi-Vision broadcasting for satellite broadcasting (ISDB-S) (BS/110-degree CS) and terrestrial digital Hi-Vision broadcasting (ISDB-T). Note that analog Hi-Vision broadcasting (MUSE) via satellite broadcast was discontinued on September 30, 2007 and now only digital versions are available.

== Analog Hi-Vision ==
After the 1964 Tokyo Olympics, research began at the NHK Science & Technology Research Laboratories to find a way to develop a higher quality image that would be possible to broadcast across televisions within the country.

In 1976, the world's first 30-inch Hi-Vision monitor was completed. In the 1980s, the first equipment to be compatible with the Hi-Vision video signal were released. This included professional television cameras, high-resolution cathode ray tubes, video tape recorders, and editing and production equipment. Around this time, real preparations were being made for the practical use of this standard. The nickname “Hi-Vision” also began to be used around this time.

In May 1982, two programs, “The Beauty of Japan” and “Various Images for HDTV,” were produced as the world's first Hi-Vision production programs. On New Year's Eve the same year, the “NHK Red and White Song Contest” was recorded in Hi-Vision for the first time. It was recorded as an experiment to see how viable it was to record and produce in Hi-Vision. Then in 1989 for its 40th edition, the contest was again recorded in Hi-Vision where it then continued to be recorded in the same standard to this day.

In 1984, the MUSE (Multiple Sub-Nyquist Sampling Encoding) system was developed, which used digital technology to compress the bandwidth and enable analog broadcasting via satellite. Satellite television used MUSE experimentally in 1989 with some compatible equipment being used to broadcast music programs and select content.

During the 1990s, Hi-Vision compatible products were starting to become available for home consumers with the most notable being Hi-Vision LD. This was an enhanced version of LaserDisc that was compatible with the MUSE format and offered Hi-Vision quality. The product saw huge success and led to many titles being released in the format. This product was only released in Japan. A less successful consumer product that was released was W-VHS, a videocassette format that also used MUSE. It was available internationally, however was not successful globally or even locally compared to Hi-Vision LD.

NHK wanted to establish Hi-Vision (1125/60 HDTV) and MUSE as the global standard for HDTV after having success developing it and deploying it within the country. Part of this plan involved using the term “High Definition Television” as the English translation for their Japanese term “高品位テレビ” rather than Hi-Vision.

Initially, NHK had set the aspect ratio for Hi-Vision television at 5:3 (1.67:1), which is close to the European Vista standard, but during the standardization process it was adjusted to 16:9 (1.78:1), which is closer to middle point between the European and American Vista standards (1.85:1).

== Digital Hi-Vision ==
NHK wanted to establish Hi-Vision television as a global standard and continued to actively promote standardization across Europe and the US. However, due to political reasons and other factors; Japan, the US, and Europe ended up adopting different formats for HDTV broadcasting.

In the US, HDTV development skipped analog broadcasting and to use digital broadcasting from the start. Europe did the same.

In Japan, on September 30, 2007, analog HDTV satellite broadcast was shut down, leaving only digital Hi-Vision. The technology was replaced by Japan's ISDB digital standard.

== Device support for Hi-Vision ==
=== Hi-Vision LaserDiscs ===
On May 20, 1994, Panasonic released the first Hi-Vision LaserDisc player. There were a number of Hi-Vision LaserDisc players available in Japan: Pioneer HLD-XØ, HLD-X9, HLD-1000, HLD-V500, HLD-V700; Sony HIL-1000, HIL-C1 and HIL-C2EX; the last two of which have OEM versions made by Panasonic, LX-HD10 and LX-HD20. Players also supported standard NTSC LaserDiscs. Hi-Vision LaserDiscs are extremely rare and expensive.

The HDL-5800 Video Disc Recorder recorded both high definition still images and continuous video onto an optical disc and was part of the early analog wideband Sony HDVS high-definition video system which supported the MUSE system. Capable of recording HD still images and video onto either the WHD-3AL0 or the WHD-33A0 optical disc; WHD-3Al0 for CLV mode (up to 10 minute video or 18,000 still frames per side); WHD-33A0 for CAV mode (up to 3 minute video or 5400 still frames per side). These video discs were used for short video content such as advertisements and product demonstrations.

The HDL-2000 was a full band high definition video disc player.

=== Reel to reel VTRs ===
==== Analog VTRs ====
For recording Hi-Vision signals, Three reel to reel analog video tape recorders (VTRs) were released, among them are the Sony HDV-1000 part of their HDVS line, the NEC TT 8-1000 and the Toshiba TVR-1000.

These analog VTRs, following the temporary Tsukuba Hi-Vision standard, had a head drum angular speed of 3600 RPM and are similar to Type C VTRs. They output a video bandwidth of 30 MHz for luma and 7 MHz for both chroma channels each, with a signal to noise ratio of 41 dB. They accept luma and chroma signals with video bandwidths of up to 30 MHz for both. Video bandwidth is measured before FM modulation. Signals are recorded onto the tape using FM modulation.

Linear tape speed is 483.1 mm/s and writing speed at the heads is 25.9 m/s. The head drum is 134.5 mm wide and has 4 video record heads, 4 video playback heads and 1 video erasing head. It could record for 45 minutes on 10.5 inch reels. These machines, unlike conventional type C VTRs, are incapable of showing images while paused or playing the tape at low speeds. However they may be equipped with a frame store to capture images and display them while fast forwarding or rewinding the tape.

The video heads are made of Mn-Zn ferrite material, those used for recording have a gap of 0.7 microns and a width of 80 microns and those for playback have a gap of 0.35 microns and a width of 70 microns. It records audio on 3 linear tracks, and control signals on a linear track. Unlike conventional type C videotape recorders, vertical blanking intervals are not recorded on the tape. Helical tracks have groups of 4 signals or channels, arranged side by side and length-wise with red chrominance, blue chrominance, and two green chrominance signals with luminance information. Two tracks for green chrominance plus luminance are used to increase the bandwidth of these signals that can be recorded on the tape. Each of these 4 signals have a video bandwidth of 10 MHz.

The VTR uses Iron metal oxide tape with cobalt for high coercivity, with capacity for 40 MHz of bandwidth at a head drum speed of 3600 RPM, which is sufficient for applying FM modulation to 10 MHz signals. To record 4 channels simultaneously in a single helical track, a separate, independent video head is required for each channel, and 4 video heads are grouped together which make a single helical track with 4 channels.

==== Digital VTRs ====
In 1987, technical standards for digital recording of Hi-Vision signals were released by NHK, thus Sony developed the HDD-1000 VTR as part of their HDVS line, and Hitachi developed the HV-1200 digital reel to reel VTR. Audio is recorded digitally similarly to a DASH (Digital Audio Stationary Head) digital audio recorder, but several changes were made to synchronize the audio to the video. These digital VTRs can record 8 channels of digital audio on linear tracks (horizontally along the entire length of the tape).

According to the standards, these VTRs operate with a head drum speed of 7200 RPM to accommodate the higher signal bandwidths of digital signal modulation on the tape which is also accommodated with the use of metal alloy particle tape, have a bit rate of 148.5 Mbit/s per video head, a linear tape speed of 805.2 mm/s and a writing speed at the heads of 51.5 m/s, are similar to Type C VTRs, have a head drum 135mm wide, 8 video playback, 8 video recording and 2 video erase heads, with 37 micron wide helical tracks. Output signal bandwidth is 30 Mhz of video bandwidth for luma (Y) and 15 Mhz of video bandwidth for chroma (P_{b}, P_{r}).

Audio is recorded with a sampling rate of 48 kHz stored at 16 bits per sample in linear tape tracks, sampling rate for luma is 74.25 Mhz and 37.125 Mhz for chroma stored at 8 bits per sample. Signal to noise ratio is 56 dB for chroma and luma. Video fields are divided into 16 helical tracks on the tape. Total video bandwidth is 1.188 gigabits/s. Cue signals are recorded into 3 linear tape tracks. Video is recorded in groups of 4 tracks or channels, which are side by side length-wise within each helical track, to allow for parallelization: high total data rates with relatively low data rates per head, and reduce the linear tape speed.

Digital video signals are recorded line by line (1 row of pixels in every frame of video or 1 line of video at a time) with ECC (Error Correcting Code) at the end of each line and in between a number of vertical lines. Reed-Solomon code is used for ECC and each line also has an ID number for trick play such as slow motion and picture search/shuttle.

=== Displays ===
Hi-Vision requires a display capable of handling 30 Mhz of video bandwidth simultaneously for each of the component video channels: R, G, B or Y, P_{b} and P_{r}. It was displayed on direct view color CRTs and CRT projectors, and plasma displays and Talaria projectors were explored to determine their ability to display Hi-Vision images. Some TVs have built in MUSE decoders.

=== Cameras ===
Cameras based on Saticon tubes, Plumbicon tubes, Harpicon tubes and CCD image sensors were used to capture footage using the Hi-Vision format. A prototype based on Vidicon tubes was also created.

=== MUSE decoders ===
A MUSE (Multiple Sub-Nyquist Sampling Encoding) decoder is required for receiving MUSE broadcasts from satellites, and for viewing content in the MUSE format. The decoder converts MUSE format signals into Hi-Vision component video signals that can then be shown in a display.

=== Video cassettes ===
W-VHS allowed home recording of Hi-Vision programmes.

==== UniHi ====
For recording Hi-Vision video signals, NHK and 10 Japanese companies ("NEC, Matsushita Electric Industrial, Toshiba, Sharp, Sony, Hitachi, Sanyo Electric, JVC, Mitsubishi Electric, Canon") in 1989 released UniHi, a professional videocassette format. Recorders for the format were manufactured by Panasonic, Sony, NEC, and Toshiba. These machines were less expensive than their Type C counterparts. Both studio and portable versions were made.

The head drum spins at 5400 RPM and uses tape that is 12.65 mm wide. It has a luminance (Y) bandwidth of 20 MHz and a chrominance (P_{b}, P_{r}) bandwidth of 7 MHz for video output. Video is recorded in analog form as an FM signal. The head drum is 76mm wide. It uses two video heads with azimuth recording and records each frame of video into 12 helical tracks; only 6 tracks are necessary for each video field if recording interlaced video. Audio is recorded digitally as a PCM signal, as a section on the helical tracks with 48 KHz sampling rate and 16 bit per sample resolution with two channels of audio on the helical tracks. Writing speed at the heads is 21.4 m/s.

The tape also has 3 linear tracks, one for audio, control and time code each. Signal to noise ratio for luminance is 41 dB and for chrominance it is 47 dB. The tape is wrapped 180° around the head drum. Development began in 1987. It uses metal particle tape. It could record video for 1 hour (63 minutes). Linear tape speed is 120 mm/s. The cassette measures 205mm (width) x 121mm (depth) x 25mm (height). Signals are recorded using time-compression integration, in groups of two signals length-wise on each helical track. Grouping is used to increase the bandwidth that can be recorded on the tape. Each individual signal is 20 microns wide. The cassette is intended to be air-tight with two flaps in the cassette's opening to protect the tape which is 13.5 microns thick.

This videocassette format was developed in order to reduce the size of HD recording equipment. The Sony version of the UniHi VTR, the HDV-10, had a price of over 90,000 US dollars.
