= High-definition television =

TV resolution standard

High-definition television (HDTV; also known as high-definition or HD) describes a television or video system which provides a substantially higher image resolution than the previous generation of technologies. The term has been used since at least 1933; in more recent times, it refers to the generation following standard-definition television (SDTV). It is the standard video format used in most broadcasts: terrestrial broadcast television, cable television, and satellite television.

== Formats ==
HDTV may be transmitted in various formats:

- 720p (1280 × 720p): 921,600 pixels
- 1080i (1920 × 1080i) interlaced scan: 1,036,800 pixels (≈1.04 Mpx).
- 1080p (1920 × 1080p) progressive scan: 2,073,600 pixels (≈2.07 Mpx).
  - Some countries also use a non-standard CTA resolution, such as 1440 × 1080i: 777,600 pixels (≈0.78 Mpx) per field or 1,555,200 pixels (≈1.56 Mpx) per frame

When transmitted at two megapixels per frame, HDTV provides about five times as many pixels as SD (standard-definition television). The increased resolution provides for a clearer, more detailed picture. In addition, progressive scan and higher frame rates result in a picture with less flicker and better rendering of fast motion. Modern HDTV began broadcasting in 1989 in Japan, under the MUSE/Hi-Vision analog system. HDTV was widely adopted worldwide in the late 2000s.

== Standards ==
Map of digital terrestrial television broadcasting standards by country

All modern high-definition broadcasts utilize digital television standards.

The major digital television broadcast standards used for terrestrial, cable, satellite, and mobile devices are:

- DVB, originating in Europe and also used in much of Asia, Africa, and Australia
- ATSC, used in much of North America
- DTMB, used in China and some neighboring countries
- ISDB, used in two incompatible variations in Japan and South America
- DMB, used by mobile devices in South Korea

These standards use a variety of video codecs, some of which are also used for internet video.

== History ==
The term high definition once described a series of television systems first announced in 1933 and launched starting in August 1936; however, these systems were only high definition when compared to earlier systems that were based on mechanical systems with as few as 30 lines of resolution. The ongoing competition between companies and nations to create true HDTV spanned the entire 20th century, as each new system became higher definition than the last. With the 525-line NTSC and 625-line PAL and SECAM analog TV standards used in most countries through the 1980s, the term High Definition Television became used for future broadcast systems with much higher resolution, typically at least 4-5X the resolution of these NTSC, PAL, and SECAM standards. Digital HDTV signals with 720p (Progressive) and 1080i (Interlaced) resolutions started to be delivered in the late 1990s and early 2000s, followed by 1080p. In the 2014-16 timeframe, this race continued with 4K, and later 5K (with some computer monitors), and 8K systems.

The British television service started trials in August 1936, and a regular service debuted on 2 November 1936, using both the (mechanical) Baird 240 line sequential scan (later referred to as progressive) and the (electronic) Marconi-EMI 405 line interlaced systems. The Baird system was discontinued in February 1937. In 1938, France followed with its own 441-line system, variants of which were also used by a number of other countries. The US NTSC 525-line system joined in 1941. In 1949, France introduced an even higher-resolution standard at 819 lines, a system that would have been high definition even by modern standards, if it had not required such bandwidth for a color version, which prevented the addition of other TV channels (nevertheless, it remained in use until 1983). All of these systems used interlacing and a 4:3 aspect ratio except the 240-line system which was progressive (actually described at the time by the technically correct term sequential) and the 405-line system which started as 5:4 and later changed to 4:3. The 405-line system adopted the (at that time) revolutionary idea of interlaced scanning to overcome the flicker problem of the 240-line with its 25 Hz frame rate. The 240-line system could have doubled its frame rate but this would have meant that the transmitted signal would have doubled in bandwidth, an unacceptable option as the video baseband bandwidth was required to be not more than 3 MHz.

Color broadcasts started at similar line counts, first with the US NTSC color system in 1953, which was compatible with the earlier monochrome systems and therefore had the same 525 lines per frame. European standards did not follow until the 1960s, when the PAL and SECAM color systems were added to the monochrome 625-line broadcasts.

In the late 1980s, both Japan (NHK) and Europe (the EU and various companies such as Philips and Thomson) were developing analog HDTV systems, called MUSE and HD-MAC respectively. Then, General Instrument Corporation's VideoCipher Division, based in San Diego, California, announced the development of an all-digital HDTV system, marking the possibility that HDTV signals could be efficiently broadcast over satellite, cable, and over-the-air spectrum. General Instrument demonstrated the feasibility of an all-digital HDTV signal, persuading the FCC to delay its decision on an advanced television (ATV) standard for the US until a digitally-based standard could be developed, resulting in several actions. First, the FCC declared that the new TV standard must be more than an enhanced analog signal, capable of providing a genuine HDTV signal with at least twice the resolution of existing television images. Second, to ensure that viewers who did not wish to buy a new digital television set could continue to receive conventional television broadcasts, it dictated that the new ATV standard must be capable of being simulcast with NTSC on different channels. The new ATV standard also allowed the new DTV signal to be based on entirely new design principles, incorporating many improvements over existing analog television.

General Instrument (GI), however, recognized that digital HDTV would likely take many years for market development, therefore deciding to focus its original product development and marketing plans on a digital standard definition system (digital SDTV) for satellite TV and cable TV applications, receivable via a home digital set-top box for display on the enormous global installed base of NTSC, PAL, and SECAM television sets.

Because there were no technical standards yet for digital TV, GI had to develop a complete (proprietary) end-to-end digital TV system comprising: (a) its breakthrough video compression algorithms; (b) a new digital transmission system (forward error correction coding and digital modulation for satellite and cable delivery); and (c) a conditional access and encryption system for content security and monetization by media companies.

At the September 1990 International Broadcasting Convention (IBC) trade show in Brighton, England, GI demonstrated its DigiCipher digital television system, incorporating a flexible degree of compression from 2:1 (HD) and up to 10:1 (SD) within a single satellite transponder or 6 MHz cable TV channel, effectively giving a 10X bandwidth efficiency improvement relative to analog TV. The advent of digital SDTV television meant, in the US and elsewhere, that Direct Broadcast Satellite (DBS) services could suddenly deliver hundreds of digital TV channels through a single high-power satellite to pizza-size home dishes, thereby becoming the first real competitive threat to the dominant cable operators.

Meanwhile, the US over-the-air broadcast HDTV process was undergoing a rigorous process conducted by the FCC's Advisory Committee on Advanced Television Service (ACATS) through its Advanced Television Test Center (ATTC) located in Alexandria, Virginia. After GI announced digital HDTV, six HDTV systems were tested sequentially in 1992. The digital HDTV prototypes were developed by: General Instrument, in partnership with MIT; a competing consortium comprising Philips, Thomson, Sarnoff Labs, and NBC; and another alliance of Zenith Electronics and AT&T. After the competitive testing phase, the various companies were strongly encouraged to come together in a "Grand Alliance," with a goal of combining the various technologies into a unified digital HDTV broadcast system. Key technical elements of the system included MPEG-2 video (with interlaced and progressive formats), Dolby AC-3 audio, MPEG-2 transport, System Information (SI) tables, and 8-VSB transmission.

Since the formal adoption of Digital Video Broadcasting's (DVB) widescreen HDTV transmission modes in the mid to late 2000s, the 525-line NTSC (and PAL-M) systems, as well as the European 625-line PAL and SECAM systems, have been regarded as standard definition television systems.

=== Analog systems ===
Early HDTV broadcasting used analog technology that was later converted to digital television with video compression.

In 1949, France started its transmissions with an 819-line system (with 737 active lines). The system was monochrome only and was used only on VHF for the first French TV channel. It was discontinued in 1983.

In 1958, the Soviet Union developed Transformator (Russian: Трансформатор, meaning Transformer), the first high-resolution (definition) television system capable of producing an image composed of 1,125 lines of resolution aimed at providing teleconferencing for military command. It was a research project and the system was never deployed by either the military or consumer broadcasting.

=== Development ===
The NHK (Japan Broadcasting Corporation) began researching to "unlock the fundamental mechanism of video and sound interactions with the five human senses" in 1964, after the Tokyo Olympics. In 1970 they began developing HDTV with extensive pyschophysical testing and in 1972 submitted a draft of their study program to Study Group II of Comité Consultatif International Radio (CCIR). NHK set out to create an HDTV system that scored much higher in subjective tests than NTSC's previously dubbed HDTV. This new system, NHK Color, created in 1972, included 1125 lines, a 5:3 (1.67:1) aspect ratio and 60 Hz refresh rate. In 1973, NHK published papers on a 1125 line camera and CRT display devices, and the following year, the CCIR Study Group II issued Report 801 on HDTV.

In 1977, the Society of Motion Picture and Television Engineers (SMPTE), headed by Charles Ginsburg, formed a study group on HDTV and became the testing and study authority for HDTV technology internationally. SMPTE would test HDTV systems from different companies from every conceivable perspective, but the problem of combining the different formats plagued the technology for many years.

There were four major HDTV systems tested by SMPTE in the late 1970s:

- EIA monochrome: 4:3 aspect ratio, 1023 lines, 60 Hz
- NHK color: 5:3 aspect ratio, 1125 lines, 60 Hz
- NHK monochrome: 4:3 aspect ratio, 2125 lines, 50 Hz
- BBC colour: 8:3 aspect ratio, 1501 lines, 60 Hz

The output of the SMPTE study group was released in 1980.

In 1978, A Study of High Definition Television Systems in the Future by Dr Takashi Fujio of NHK was published in the Institute of Electrical and Electronics Engineers' Transactions on Broadcasting. The same year, the first satellite transmission tests of 1125 line HDTV signals were performed in Japan (although not reported on until 1980) and the BBC published a report raising the possibility of broadcasting by satellite and the potential impact on HDTV standards.

In 1979, the Japanese public broadcaster NHK first developed consumer high-definition television with a 5:3 display aspect ratio. The standard was known as Hi-Vision and used a system called MUSE (multiple sub-Nyquist sampling encoding) for encoding the signal. It required about twice the bandwidth of the existing NTSC system but provided about four times the resolution (1035i/1125 lines). In 1981, the MUSE system was demonstrated for the first time in the United States, using the same 5:3 aspect ratio as the Japanese system. Upon visiting a demonstration of MUSE in Washington D.C., US President Ronald Reagan was impressed and officially declared it "a matter of national interest" to introduce HDTV to the US. CBS filed a document with the Federal Communications Commission (FCC) to request that the 12 GHz spectrum be dedicated to HDTV. NHK taped the 1984 Summer Olympics with a Hi-Vision camera, weighing 40 kg.

Satellite test broadcasts started in Japan on June 4, 1989, the first daily high-definition programs in the world, with regular testing starting on November 25, 1991, or "Hi-Vision Day" – dated exactly to refer to its 1,125-lines resolution. Regular broadcasting of BS-9ch commenced on November 25, 1994, which featured commercial and NHK programming.

==== United States ====
In 1982, HDTV test production and demonstrations took place in the United States and CBS conducted 12 GHz broadcast experiments. The same year, the Advanced Television Systems Committee (ATSC) was formed by the U.S. Joint Committee for Intersociety Coordination. In 1983, CBS announced a 2-channel HDTV system. Several systems were proposed as the new standard for the US, including the Japanese MUSE system, but all were rejected by the FCC because of their higher bandwidth requirements. At this time, the number of television channels was growing rapidly and bandwidth was already a problem. A new standard had to be more efficient, needing less bandwidth for HDTV than the existing NTSC. In 1985, ATSC approved the basic parameters for HDTV production standards (16:9 aspect ratio, 1,125 lines and 60 Hertz field rate) and the CCIR Working Party submitted their recommendations to Study Group II, including basic parameters for HDTV production standards. CBS broadcast the 1986 Asian Games whose images originated in HDTV.

HDTV technology was introduced in the United States in the early 1990s and made official in 1993 by the Digital HDTV Grand Alliance, a group of television, electronic equipment, communications companies consisting of AT&T Bell Labs, General Instrument, Philips, Sarnoff, Thomson, Zenith and the Massachusetts Institute of Technology. Field testing of HDTV at 199 sites in the United States was completed August 14, 1994.

The first public HDTV broadcast in the United States occurred on July 23, 1996, when the Raleigh, North Carolina television station WRAL-HD began broadcasting from the existing tower of WRAL-TV southeast of Raleigh, winning a race to be first with the HD Model Station in Washington, D.C., which began broadcasting July 31, 1996 with the callsign WHD-TV, based out of the facilities of NBC owned and operated station WRC-TV.

On April 3, 1997, the FCC allocated 6 MHz of spectrum to every broadcaster for digital programming. All network-affiliated broadcasters were required to transmit digital broadcasts in the top ten markets by May 1999, reaching nearly 30 percent of American households. By November 1999, the network affiliates were expected to transmit in 20 additional markets, bringing DTV availability to nearly 50 percent of American households. All other commercial stations were expected to start transmitting DTV by May 2002, and non-commercial stations to begin digital transmission by May 2003.

The ATSC's HDTV system had its public launch on October 29, 1998, during the live coverage of astronaut John Glenn's return mission to space on board the Space Shuttle Discovery. The signal was transmitted coast-to-coast and was seen by the public in science centers and other public theaters specially equipped to receive and display the broadcast.

As the turn of the century approached, the "chicken and egg" HDTV situation between lack of HD content and the small installed base of consumer HDTV sets began to make progress. The FCC had mandated that US TV stations in the top 30 markets, covering half of US television households, must start broadcasting digital signals by November 1999. There was no requirement, however, for the content to be in HDTV format, so long as it was in a digital SDTV format. CBS began some limited digital HD broadcasting of certain special events, such as the October 1998 spectacle of astronaut and US Senator John Glenn becoming the oldest person to fly in space aboard the space shuttle Discovery, with 8 CBS affiliates carrying the network broadcast in high definition. The following month, ABC delivered the movie 101 Dalmations in HD, and then on January 30, 2000, ABC broadcast Super Bowl XXXIV in HD.

==== European HDTV broadcasts ====
In 1981, the European Broadcasting Union set up Working Party V on HDTV. In 1983, demonstrations of HDTV were held at the Montreux TV Symposium.

In 1986, the European Community proposed HD-MAC, an analog HDTV system with 1152 lines. A public demonstration took place for the 1992 Summer Olympics in Barcelona. However, HD-MAC was scrapped in 1993 and the DVB project was formed, which would foresee development of a digital HDTV standard.

Between 1988 and 1991, several European organizations were working on discrete cosine transform (DCT) based digital video coding standards for both SDTV and HDTV. The EU 256 project by the CMTT and ETSI, along with research by Italian broadcaster RAI, developed a DCT video codec that broadcast near-studio-quality HDTV transmission at about 70–140 Mbit/s. The first HDTV transmissions in Europe, albeit not direct-to-home, began in 1990, when RAI broadcast the 1990 FIFA World Cup using several experimental HDTV technologies, including the digital DCT-based EU 256 codec, the mixed analog-digital HD-MAC technology, and the analog MUSE technology. The matches were shown in 8 cinemas in Italy, where the tournament was played, and 2 in Spain. The connection with Spain was made via the Olympus satellite link from Rome to Barcelona and then with a fiber optic connection from Barcelona to Madrid. After some HDTV transmissions in Europe, the standard was abandoned in 1993, to be replaced by a digital format from DVB.

The first regular broadcasts began on January 1, 2004, when the Belgian company Euro1080 launched the HD1 channel with the traditional Vienna New Year's Concert. Test transmissions had been active since the IBC exhibition in September 2003, but the New Year's Day broadcast marked the official launch of the HD1 channel, and the official start of direct-to-home HDTV in Europe.

Euro1080, a division of the later defunct Belgian TV services company Alfacam, broadcast HDTV channels to break the pan-European stalemate of "no HD broadcasts mean no HD TVs bought means no HD broadcasts ..." and kick-start HDTV interest in Europe. The HD1 channel was initially free-to-air and mainly comprised sporting, dramatic, musical and other cultural events broadcast with a multi-lingual soundtrack on a rolling schedule of four or five hours per day.

These first European HDTV broadcasts used the 1080i format with MPEG-2 compression on a DVB-S signal from SES's Astra 1H satellite. Euro1080 transmissions later changed to MPEG-4/AVC compression on a DVB-S2 signal in line with subsequent broadcast channels in Europe.

Despite delays in some countries, the number of European HD channels and viewers has risen steadily since the first HDTV broadcasts, with SES's annual Satellite Monitor market survey for 2010 reporting more than 200 commercial channels broadcasting in HD from Astra satellites, 185 million HD capable TVs sold in Europe (£60 million in 2010 alone), and 20 million households (27% of all European digital satellite TV homes) watching HD satellite broadcasts (16 million via Astra satellites).

In December 2009, the United Kingdom became the first European country to deploy high-definition content using the new DVB-T2 transmission standard, as specified in the Digital TV Group (DTG) D-book, on digital terrestrial television.

The Freeview HD service contains 13 HD channels (as of April 2016) and was rolled out region by region across the UK in accordance with the digital switchover process, finally being completed in October 2012. However, Freeview HD is not the first HDTV service over digital terrestrial television in Europe; Italy's RAI started broadcasting in 1080i on April 24, 2008, using the DVB-T transmission standard.

In October 2008, France deployed five high definition channels using the DVB-T transmission standard on digital terrestrial distribution.

=== Rise of digital compression ===
High-definition digital television was not possible with uncompressed video, which requires a bandwidth exceeding 1 Gbit/s for studio-quality HD digital video. Digital HDTV was made possible by the development of discrete cosine transform (DCT) video compression. DCT coding is a lossy image compression technique that was first proposed by Nasir Ahmed in 1972, and was later adapted into a motion-compensated DCT algorithm for video coding standards such as the H.26x formats from 1988 onwards and the MPEG formats from 1993 onwards. Motion-compensated DCT compression significantly reduces the amount of bandwidth required for a digital TV signal. By 1991, it had achieved data compression ratios from 8:1 to 14:1 for near-studio-quality HDTV transmission, down to 70–140 Mbit/s. Between 1988 and 1991, DCT video compression was widely adopted as the video coding standard for HDTV implementations, enabling the development of practical digital HDTV. Dynamic random-access memory (DRAM) was also adopted as framebuffer semiconductor memory, with the DRAM semiconductor industry's increased manufacturing and reducing prices important to the commercialization of HDTV.

Since 1972, CCIR (later renamed ITU-R) had been working on creating a global recommendation for Analog HDTV. These recommendations, however, did not fit in the broadcasting bands that could reach home users. The standardization of MPEG-1 in 1993 led to the acceptance of recommendations ITU-R BT.709. In anticipation of these standards, the DVB organization was formed. It was an alliance of broadcasters, consumer electronics manufacturers and regulatory bodies. The DVB develops and agrees upon specifications which are formally standardised by ETSI.

DVB first created the standard for DVB-S digital satellite TV, DVB-C digital cable TV and DVB-T digital terrestrial TV. These broadcasting systems can be used for both SDTV and HDTV. In the US, the Grand Alliance proposed ATSC as the new standard for SDTV and HDTV. Both ATSC and DVB were based on the MPEG-2 standard, although DVB systems may also be used to transmit video using the newer and more efficient H.264/MPEG-4 AVC compression standards. Common for all DVB standards is the use of highly efficient modulation techniques for further reducing bandwidth, and foremost for reducing receiver hardware and antenna requirements.

In 1983, the CCIR Study Group II set up a working party (Interim Working Party 11/6 - IWP11/6) with the aim of setting a single international HDTV standard. One of the thornier issues concerned a suitable frame/field refresh rate, the world already having split into two camps, 25/50 Hz and 30/60 Hz, largely due to the differences in mains frequency. The IWP11/6 working party considered many views and, throughout the 1980s, served to encourage development in a number of video digital processing areas, not least conversion between the two main frame/field rates using motion vectors, which led to further developments in other areas. While a comprehensive HDTV standard was not in the end established, agreement on the aspect ratio was achieved.

Initially, the existing 5:3 aspect ratio had been the main candidate, but due to the influence of widescreen cinema, the aspect ratio 16:9 (1.78) eventually emerged as being a reasonable compromise between 5:3 (1.67) and the common 1.85 widescreen cinema format. An aspect ratio of 16:9 was duly agreed upon at the first meeting of the IWP11/6 working party at the BBC's Research and Development establishment in Kingswood Warren. The resulting ITU-R Recommendation ITU-R BT.709-2 ("Rec. 709") includes the 16:9 aspect ratio, a specified colorimetry, and the scan modes 1080i (1,080 actively interlaced lines of resolution) and 1080p (1,080 progressively scanned lines). The British Freeview HD trials used MBAFF, which contains both progressive and interlaced content in the same encoding.

It also includes the alternative 1440×1152 HDMAC scan format. (According to some reports, a mooted 750-line (720p) format (720 progressively scanned lines) was viewed by some at the ITU as an enhanced television format rather than a true HDTV format, and so was not included, although 1920×1080i and 1280×720p systems for a range of frame and field rates were defined by several US SMPTE standards.)

=== Decrease of analog HD systems ===
The limited standardization of analog HDTV in the 1990s did not lead to global HDTV adoption as technical and economic constraints at the time did not permit HDTV to use bandwidths greater than normal television. Early HDTV commercial experiments, such as NHK's MUSE, required over four times the bandwidth of a standard-definition broadcast. Despite efforts made to reduce analog HDTV to about twice the bandwidth of SDTV, these television formats were still distributable only by satellite. In Europe, too, the HD-MAC standard was considered not technically viable.

In addition, recording and reproducing an HDTV signal was a significant technical challenge in the early years of HDTV (Sony HDVS). Japan remained the only country with successful public broadcasting of analog HDTV, with seven broadcasters sharing a single channel.

However, the Hi-Vision/MUSE system also faced commercial issues when it launched in 1991. Only 2,000 HDTV sets were sold by that day, rather than the enthusiastic 1.32 million estimation. Hi-Vision sets were very expensive, up to US$30,000 each, which contributed to their low consumer adoption. A Hi-Vision VCR from NEC released at Christmas time retailed for US$115,000. In addition, the United States saw Hi-Vision/MUSE as an outdated system and had already made it clear that it would develop an all-digital system. Experts thought the commercial Hi-Vision system in 1992 was already eclipsed by digital technology developed in the U.S. since 1990. This was an American victory against the Japanese in terms of technological dominance. By mid-1993 prices of receivers were still as high as 1.5 million yen (US$15,000).

On 23 February 1994, a top broadcasting administrator in Japan admitted failure of its analog-based HDTV system, saying the U.S. digital format would be more likely a worldwide standard. However, this announcement drew angry protests from broadcasters and electronic companies who invested heavily into the analog system. As a result, he took back his statement the next day saying that the government will continue to promote Hi-Vision/MUSE. That year NHK started development of digital television in an attempt to catch back up to America and Europe. This resulted in the ISDB format. Japan started digital satellite and HDTV broadcasting in December 2000.

== Notation ==
HDTV broadcast systems are identified with three major parameters:

- Frame size in pixels is defined as number of horizontal pixels × number of vertical pixels, for example 1280 × 720 or 1920 × 1080. Often, the number of horizontal pixels is implied from context and is omitted, as in the case of 720p and 1080p.
- Scanning system is identified with the letter p for progressive scanning or i for interlaced scanning.
- Frame rate is identified as the number of video frames per second. For interlaced systems, the number of frames per second should be specified, but it is not uncommon to see the field rate incorrectly used instead.

If all three parameters are used, they are specified in the following form: [frame size][scanning system][frame or field rate] or [frame size]/[frame or field rate][scanning system]. Often, frame size or frame rate can be dropped if its value is implied from context. In this case, the remaining numeric parameter is specified first, followed by the scanning system.

For example, 1920×1080p25 identifies progressive scanning format with 25 frames per second, each frame being 1,920 pixels wide and 1,080 pixels high. The 1080i25 or 1080i50 notation identifies an interlaced scanning format with 25 frames (50 fields) per second, each frame being 1,920 pixels wide and 1,080 pixels high. The 1080i30 or 1080i60 notation identifies an interlaced scanning format with 30 frames (60 fields) per second, each frame being 1,920 pixels wide and 1,080 pixels high. The 720p60 notation identifies progressive scanning format with 60 frames per second, each frame being 720 pixels high; 1,280 pixels horizontally are implied.

Systems using 50 Hz support three scanning rates: 50i, 25p and 50p, while 60 Hz systems support a much wider set of frame rates: 59.94i, 60i, 23.976p, 24p, 29.97p, 30p, 59.94p and 60p. In the days of standard-definition television, the fractional rates were often rounded up to whole numbers, e.g., 23.976p was often called 24p, or 59.94i was often called 60i. Sixty Hertz high definition television supports both fractional and slightly different integer rates; strict usage of notation is required to avoid ambiguity. Nevertheless, 29.97p/59.94i is almost universally called 60i, likewise 23.976p is called 24p.

For the commercial naming of a product, the frame rate is often dropped and is implied from context (e.g., a 1080i television set). A frame rate can also be specified without a resolution. For example, 24p means 24 progressive scan frames per second, and 50i means 25 interlaced frames per second.

There is no single standard for HDTV color support. Colors are typically broadcast using a (10-bit per channel) YUV color space, but, depending on the underlying image generating technologies of the receiver, are then subsequently converted to a RGB color space using standardized algorithms. When transmitted directly through the Internet, the colors are typically pre-converted to 8-bit RGB channels for additional storage savings with the assumption that it will only be viewed on a (sRGB) computer screen. As an added benefit to the original broadcasters, the losses of the pre-conversion essentially make these files unsuitable for professional TV re-broadcasting.

Most HDTV systems support resolutions and frame rates defined either in the ATSC table 3 or in the EBU specification. The most common are noted below.

=== Display resolutions ===
Video format supported [image resolution]	Native resolution [inherent resolution] (W×H)	Pixels		Aspect ratio (W:H)		Description
Video format supported [image resolution]	Native resolution [inherent resolution] (W×H)	Actual	Advertised (Megapixels)	Image	Pixel	Description
720p (HD ready); 1280×720	1024 × 768; XGA	786,432	0.8	4:3 (1.33:1)	1:1 (1.00:1)	Typically a PC resolution (XGA); also a native resolution on many entry-level plasma displays with non-square pixels.
720p (HD ready); 1280×720	1280 × 720	921,600	0.9	16:9 (1.78:1)	1:1	Standard HDTV resolution and a typical PC resolution (WXGA), frequently used by high-end video projectors; also used for 750-line video, as defined in SMPTE 296M, ATSC A/53, ITU-R BT.1543.
720p (HD ready); 1280×720	1366 × 768; WXGA	1,049,088	1.0	683:384 (approx. 16:9)	1:1	A typical PC resolution (WXGA); also used by many HD ready TV displays based on LCD technology.
1080p / 1080i (Full HD); 1920×1080	1920 × 1080	2,073,600	2.1	16:9	1:1	Standard HDTV resolution, used by full HD and HD ready 1080p TV displays such as high-end LCD, plasma and rear projection TVs, and a typical PC resolution (lower than WUXGA); also used for 1125-line video, as defined in SMPTE 274M, ATSC A/53, ITU-R BT.709

Video format supported	Screen resolution (W×H)	Pixels		Aspect ratio (W:H)		Description
Video format supported	Screen resolution (W×H)	Actual	Advertised (Megapixels)	Image	Pixel	Description
720p (HD Ready); 1280×720	1248 × 702; Clean Aperture	876,096	0.9	16:9	1:1	Used for 750-line video with faster artifact/overscan compensation, as defined in SMPTE 296M.
1080i (Full HD); 1920×1080	1440 × 1080; HDCAM / HDV	1,555,200	1.6	16:9	4:3	Used for anamorphic 1125-line video in the HDCAM and HDV formats introduced by Sony and defined (also as a luminance subsampling matrix) in SMPTE D11.
1080p (Full HD); 1920×1080	1888 × 1062; Clean aperture	2,005,056	2.0	16:9	1:1	Used for 1124-line video with faster artifact/overscan compensation, as defined in SMPTE 274M.

At a minimum, HDTV has twice the linear resolution of standard-definition television (SDTV), thus showing greater detail than either analog television or regular DVD. The technical standards for broadcasting HDTV also handle the 16:9 aspect ratio images without using letterboxing or anamorphic stretching, thus increasing the effective image resolution.

A very high-resolution source may require more bandwidth than available in order to be transmitted without loss of fidelity. The lossy compression that is used in all digital HDTV storage and transmission systems will distort the received picture when compared to the uncompressed source.

=== Standard frame or field rates ===
ATSC and DVB define the following frame rates for use with the various broadcast standards:

- 23.976 Hz (film-looking frame rate compatible with NTSC clock speed standards)
- 24 Hz (international film and ATSC high-definition material)
- 25 Hz (PAL film, DVB standard-definition and high-definition material)
- 29.97 Hz (NTSC film and standard-definition material)
- 30 Hz (NTSC film, ATSC high-definition material)
- 50 Hz (DVB high-definition material)
- 59.94 Hz (ATSC high-definition material)
- 60 Hz (ATSC high-definition material)

The optimum format for a broadcast depends upon the type of videographic recording medium used and the image's characteristics. For best fidelity to the source, the transmitted field ratio, lines, and frame rate should match those of the source.

PAL, SECAM, and NTSC frame rates technically apply only to analog standard-definition television, not to digital or high definition broadcasts. However, with the rollout of digital broadcasting and later HDTV broadcasting, countries retained their heritage systems. HDTV in former PAL and SECAM countries operates at a frame rate of 25/50 Hz, while HDTV in former NTSC countries operates at 30/60 Hz.

=== Types of media ===
High-definition image sources include terrestrial broadcast, direct broadcast satellite, digital cable, IPTV, Blu-ray video disc (BD), and internet downloads.

In the US, residents in the line of sight of television station broadcast antennas can receive free, over-the-air programming with a television set with an ATSC tuner via a TV aerial. Laws prohibit homeowners' associations and city governments from banning the installation of antennas.

Standard 35mm photographic film used for cinema projection has a much higher image resolution than HDTV systems, and is exposed and projected at a rate of 24 frames per second (frame/s). To be shown on standard television, in PAL-system countries, cinema film is scanned at the TV rate of 25 frame/s, causing a speedup of 4.1 percent, which is generally considered acceptable. In NTSC-system countries, the TV scan rate of 30 frame/s would cause a perceptible speedup if the same were attempted, and the necessary correction is performed by a technique called 3:2 pulldown: Over each successive pair of film frames, one is held for three video fields (1/20 of a second) and the next is held for two video fields (1/30 of a second), giving a total time for the two frames of 1/12 of a second and thus achieving the correct average film frame rate.

Non-cinematic HDTV video recordings intended for broadcast are typically recorded either in 720p or 1080i format as determined by the broadcaster. 720p is commonly used for Internet distribution of high-definition video, because most computer monitors operate in progressive-scan mode. 720p also imposes less strenuous storage and decoding requirements compared to both 1080i and 1080p. 1080p/24, 1080i/30, 1080i/25, 720p/30, and 720p/25 is most often used on Blu-ray Disc.

== Recording and compression ==
HDTV can be recorded to D-VHS (Digital-VHS or Data-VHS), W-VHS (analog only), to an HDTV-capable digital video recorder (for example DirecTV's high-definition digital video recorder, Sky HD's set-top box, Dish Network's VIP 622 or VIP 722 high-definition digital video recorder receivers (these set-top boxes allow for HD on the Primary TV and SD on the secondary TV (TV2) without a secondary box on TV2), or TiVo's Series 3 or HD recorders), or an HDTV-ready HTPC. Some cable boxes are capable of receiving or recording two or more broadcasts at a time in HDTV format, and HDTV programming, some included in the monthly cable service subscription price, some for an additional fee, can be played back with the cable company's on-demand feature.

The massive amount of data storage required to archive uncompressed streams meant that inexpensive uncompressed storage options were not available to the consumer. In 2008, the Hauppauge 1212 Personal Video Recorder was introduced. This device accepts HD content through component video inputs and stores the content in MPEG-2 format in a .ts file or in a Blu-ray-compatible format .m2ts file on the hard drive or DVD burner of a computer connected to the PVR through a USB 2.0 interface. More recent systems are able to record a broadcast high definition program in its 'as broadcast' format or transcode to a format more compatible with Blu-ray.

Analog tape recorders with bandwidth capable of recording analog HD signals, such as W-VHS recorders, are no longer produced for the consumer market and are both expensive and scarce in the secondary market.

Set-top box tuners with external storage support may be able to directly record the digital video stream itself, including additional data such as teletext. The set-top box doesn't even need to support the audio and video encoding used, and the file recorded will be playable on any device that does support it. However, encrypted content will require a receiver with the appropriate CAS setup.

In the United States, as part of the FCC's plug and play agreement, cable companies are required to provide customers who rent HD set-top boxes with a set-top box with "functional" FireWire (IEEE 1394) on request. None of the direct broadcast satellite providers have offered this feature on any of their supported boxes, but some cable TV companies have. As of July 2004, boxes are not included in the FCC mandate. This content is protected by encryption known as 5C. This encryption can prevent duplication of content or simply limit the number of copies permitted, thus effectively denying most if not all fair use of the content.

== See also ==
- Display motion blur
- Glossary of video terms
- High Efficiency Video Coding
- List of digital television deployments by country
- Optimum HDTV viewing distance
- Ultra-high-definition television (UHD or UHDTV)
