= Multiple Sub-Nyquist Sampling Encoding =

1980s analog high-definition television standard

MUSE (Multiple sub-Nyquist Sampling Encoding), commercially known as Hi-Vision (a contraction of HIgh-definition teleVISION) was a Japanese analog high-definition television system, with design efforts going back to 1979. Traditional interlaced video shows either odd or even lines of video at any one time, but MUSE required four fields of video to complete a single video frame. Hi-Vision also refers to a closely related Japanese television system capable of transmitting video with 1035i resolution, in other words 1035 interlaced lines. MUSE was used as a compression scheme for Hi-Vision signals.

== Overview ==
It used dot-interlacing and digital video compression to deliver 1125 line, 60 field-per-second (1125i60) signals to the home. The system was standardized as ITU-R recommendation BO.786 and specified by SMPTE 260M, using a colorimetry matrix specified by SMPTE 240M. As with other analog systems, not all lines carry visible information. On MUSE there are 1035 active interlaced lines, therefore this system is sometimes also mentioned as 1035i. MUSE employed 2-dimensional filtering, dot-interlacing, motion-vector compensation and line-sequential color encoding with time compression to "fold" or compress an original 30 MHz bandwidth Hi-Vision source signal into just 8.1 MHz.

Because MUSE (Multiple Sub-Nyquist Sampling Encoding) was different as it used a four-field dot-interlacing cycle, taking four fields to complete a single MUSE frame. The interlacing was done on a pixel-by-pixel basis, reducing both horizontal and vertical resolution by half for each field of video, unlike traditional interlacing which only reduced vertical resolution and so only stationary images were transmitted at full resolution. This meant that moving images were blurred since MUSE lowered the resolution of material that changed greatly from frame to frame. MUSE used motion-compensation, so camera pans maintained full resolution, but individual moving elements could be reduced to only a quarter of the full frame resolution. As a result, the mix of motion and non-motion was encoded pixel-by-pixel, making it less noticeable.

Japan began broadcasting wideband analogue HDTV signals in December 1988, initially with an aspect ratio of 2:1. The Sony HDVS high-definition video system was used to create content for the MUSE system, but didn't record MUSE signals. It recorded Hi-Vision signals which are uncompressed. By the time of its commercial launch in 1991, digital HDTV was already under development in the United States. Hi-Vision MUSE was mainly broadcast by NHK through their BShi satellite TV channel, although other channels such as WOWOW, TV Asahi, Fuji Television, TBS Television, Nippon Television, and TV Tokyo also broadcast in MUSE.

Later improvements, known as the MUSE-III system, increased resolution in moving areas of the image and improved chroma resolution during motion. MUSE-III was used for broadcasts starting in 1995 and a few Hi-Vision MUSE LaserDiscs. There were many early complaints about the large size of the MUSE decoder led to the development of a miniaturized decoder.

On May 20, 1994, Panasonic released the first MUSE LaserDisc player. There were also a number of players available from other brands like Pioneer and Sony.

Despite shadows and multipath issues in this analog transmission mode, Japan switched to a digital HDTV system based on ISDB. Hi-Vision continued broadcasting in analog by NHK until 2007. Other channels had stopped soon after December 1, 2000 as they transitioned to digital HD signals in ISDB, Japan's digital broadcast standard.

== History ==
MUSE was developed by NHK Science & Technology Research Laboratories in the 1980s as a compression system for Hi-Vision HDTV signals.

- Japanese broadcast engineers immediately rejected conventional vestigial sideband broadcasting.
- It was decided early on that MUSE would be a satellite broadcast format as Japan economically supports satellite broadcasting. MUSE was transmitted at a frequency of 21 GHz or 12 GHz.

Modulation research

- Japanese broadcast engineers had been studying the various HDTV broadcast types for some time. It was initially thought that SHF, EHF or optic fiber would have to be used to transmit HDTV due to the high bandwidth of the signal, and HLO-PAL would be used for terrestrial broadcast. HLO-PAL is a conventionally constructed composite signal (based on $Y$ for luminance and $C$ for chroma like NTSC and PAL) and uses a phase alternating by line with half-line offset carrier encoding of the wideband/narrowband chroma components. Only the very lowest part of the wideband chroma component overlapped the high-frequency chroma. The narrowband chroma was completely separated from luminance.PAF, or phase alternating by field (like the first NTSC color system trial) was also experimented with, and it gave much better decoding results, but NHK abandoned all composite encoding systems. Because of the use of satellite transmission, Frequency modulation (FM) should be used with power-limitation problem. FM incurs triangular noise, so if a sub-carrierred composite signal is used with FM, demodulated chroma signal has more noise than luminance. Because of this, they looked at other options, and decided to use $Y/C$ component emission for satellite. At one point, it seemed that FCFE (Frame Conversion Fineness Enhanced), I/P conversion compression system, would be chosen, but MUSE was ultimately picked.
- Separate transmission of $Y$ and $C$ components was explored. The MUSE format which is transmitted today, uses separated component signalling. The improvement in picture quality was so great, that the original test systems were recalled.
- One more power saving tweak was made: lack of visual response to low frequency noise allows significant reduction in transponder power if the higher video frequencies are emphasised prior to modulation at the transmitter and de-emphasized at the receiver.

== Technical specifications ==
MUSE's "1125 lines" are an analog measurement, which includes non-video scan lines taking place while a CRT's electron beam returns to the top of the screen to begin scanning the next field. Only 1035 lines have picture information. Digital signals count only the lines (rows of pixels) that have actual detail, so NTSC's 525 lines become 486i (rounded to 480 to be MPEG compatible), PAL's 625 lines become 576i, and MUSE would be 1035i. To convert the bandwidth of Hi-Vision MUSE into "conventional" lines-of-horizontal resolution (as is used in the NTSC world), multiply 29.9 lines per MHz of bandwidth. (NTSC and PAL/SECAM are 79.9 lines per MHz) - this calculation of 29.9 lines works for all current HD systems including Blu-ray and HD-DVD. So, for MUSE, during a still picture, the lines of resolution would be: 598-lines of luminance resolution per-picture-height. The chroma resolution is: 209-lines. The horizontal luminance measurement approximately matches the vertical resolution of a 1080 interlaced image when the Kell factor and interlace factor are taken into account. 1125 lines was selected as a compromise between the resolution in lines of NTSC and PAL and then doubling this number.

MUSE employs time-compression integration (TCI) which is another term for time-division multiplexing, which is used to carry luminance, chrominance, PCM audio and sync signals on one carrier signal/in one carrier frequency. However, TCI achieves multiplexing by compression of the contents in the time dimension, in other words transmitting frames of video that are divided into regions with chrominance compressed into the left of the frame and luminance compressed into the right of the frame, which must then be expanded and layered to create a visible image. This makes it different from NTSC which carries luminance, audio and chrominance simultaneously in several carrier frequencies. Hi-Vision signals are analog component video signals with 3 channels which were RGB initially, and later YP_{b}P_{r}. The Hi-Vision standard aims to work with both RGB and YP_{b}P_{r} signals.

Key features of the MUSE system:

- Scanlines (total/active): 1,125/1,035
- Pixels per line (fully interpolated): 1122 (still image)/748 (moving)
- Reference clock periods: 1920 per active line
- Interlaced ratio: 2:1
- Aspect ratio 16:9
- Refresh rate: 59.94 or 60 frames per second
- Sampling frequency for broadcast: 16.2 MHz
- Vector motion compensation: horizontal ± 16 samples (32.4 MHz clock) / frame, a vertical line ± 3 / Field
- Audio: "DANCE" discrete 2- or 4-channel digital audio system: 48 kHz/16 bit (2 channel stereo: 2 front channels)/32 kHz/12 bit (4 channel surround: 3 front channels + 1 back channel)
- DPCM Audio compression format: DPCM quasi-instantaneous companding
- Required bandwidth: 27 MHz Usable bandwidth is 1/3 of this, 9 Mhz due to the use of FM modulation for transmission.

=== Colorimetry ===
The MUSE luminance signal $Y$ encodes $YM$, specified as the following mix of the original RGB color channels:

$$\begin{align}
YM = 0.294\,R + 0.588\,G + 0.118\,B
\end{align}$$

The chrominance $C$ signal encodes $B-YM$ and $R-YM$ difference signals. By using these three signals ($YM$, $B-YM$ and $R-YM$), a MUSE receiver can retrieve the original RGB color components using the following matrix:

$$\begin{align}
\begin{bmatrix} G \\ B \\ R \end{bmatrix}
\ =\
\begin{bmatrix}
1  &  -1/5  & -1/2 \\
1  & 1 & 0 \\
1  & 0 & 1
\end{bmatrix}
\begin{bmatrix}
1  & 0   & 0 \\
0  & 5/4 & 0 \\
0  & 0 & 1
\end{bmatrix}
\begin{bmatrix}
YM \\
B - YM \\
R- YM
\end{bmatrix}
\ =\
\begin{bmatrix}
1 &  -1/4       &  -1/2 \\
1 & 5/4 & 0\\
1 &  0 &  1
\end{bmatrix}
\begin{bmatrix} YM \\ B- YM \\ R - YM \end{bmatrix}
\end{align}$$

The system used a colorimetry matrix specified by SMPTE 240M (with coefficients corresponding to the SMPTE RP 145 primaries, also known as SMPTE-C, in use at the time the standard was created). The chromaticity of the primary colors and white point are:

MUSE colorimetry (SMPTE 240M / SMPTE "C")
White point		CCT	Primary colors (CIE 1931 xy)					
x	y	k	R_{x}	R_{y}	G_{x}	G_{y}	B_{x}	B_{y}
0.3127	0.3290	6500 (D65)	0.63	0.34	0.31	0.595	0.155	0.07

The luma ($EY$) function is specified as:

$$\begin{align}
EY = 0.212\,ER + 0.701\,EG + 0.087\,EB
\end{align}$$

The blue color difference ($EPB$) is amplitude-scaled ($EB-EY$), according to:

$$\begin{align}
EPB = 1.826\,(EB - EY)
\end{align}$$

The red color difference ($EPR$) is amplitude-scaled ($ER-EY$), according to:

$$\begin{align}
EPR = 1.576\,(ER - EY)
\end{align}$$

=== Signal and Transmission ===
MUSE is a 1125 line system (1035 visible), and is pulse and sync compatible with the digital 1080 line system used by modern HDTV. Originally, it was a 1125 line, interlaced, 60 Hz, system with a 5:3 (1.66:1) aspect ratio and an optimal viewing distance of roughly 3.3H. In 1989 this was changed to a 16:9 aspect ratio.

For terrestrial MUSE transmission a bandwidth limited FM system was devised. A satellite transmission system uses uncompressed FM.

Before MUSE compression, the Hi- Vision signal bandwidth is reduced from 30 MHz for luminance and chrominance to a pre-compression bandwidth $Y$ of 20 MHz for luminance, and a pre-compression bandwidth for chrominance is a 7.425 MHz carrier.

The Japanese initially explored the idea of frequency modulation of a conventionally constructed composite signal. This would create a signal similar in structure to the $Y/C$ composite video NTSC signal - with the $Y$ (luminance) at the lower frequencies and the $C$ (chrominance) above. Approximately 3 kW of power would be required, in order to get 40 dB of signal to noise ratio for a composite FM signal in the 22 GHz band. This was incompatible with satellite broadcast techniques and bandwidth.

To overcome this limitation, it was decided to use a separate transmission of $Y$ and $C$. This reduces the effective frequency range and lowers the required power. Approximately 570 W (360 for $Y$ and 210 for $C$) would be needed in order to get a 40 dB of signal to noise ratio for a separate $Y/C$ FM signal in the 22 GHz satellite band. This was feasible.

There is one more power saving that appears from the character of the human eye. The lack of visual response to low frequency noise allows significant reduction in transponder power if the higher video frequencies are emphasized prior to modulation at the transmitter and then de-emphasized at the receiver. This method was adopted, with crossover frequencies for the emphasis/de-emphasis at 5.2 MHz for $Y$ and 1.6 MHz for $C$. With this in place, the power requirements drop to 260 W of power (190 for $Y$ and 69 for $C$).

== Sampling systems and ratios ==
The subsampling in a video system is usually expressed as a three part ratio. The three terms of the ratio are: the number of brightness (luma) $Y$ samples, followed by the number of samples of the two color (chroma) components $Cb$ and $Cr$, for each complete sample area. Traditionally the value for brightness is always 4, with the rest of the values scaled accordingly.

A sampling of 4:4:4 indicates that all three components are fully sampled. A sampling of 4:2:0, for example, indicated that the two chroma components are sampled at half the horizontal sample rate of luma - the horizontal chroma resolution is halved. This reduces the bandwidth of an uncompressed video signal by one-third.

MUSE implements a similar system as a means of reducing bandwidth, but instead of static sampling, the actual ratio varies according to the amount of motion on the screen. In practice, MUSE sampling will vary from approximately 4:2:1 to 4:0.5:0.25, depending on the amount of movement. Thus the red-green chroma component $Cr$ has between one-half and one-eighth the sampling resolution of the luma component $Y$, and the blue-yellow chroma $Cb$ has half the resolution of red-green.

== Audio subsystem ==
MUSE had a discrete 2- or 4-channel digital audio system called "DANCE", which stood for Digital Audio Near-instantaneous Compression and Expansion.

It used differential audio transmission (differential pulse-code modulation) that was not psychoacoustics-based like MPEG-1 Layer II. It used a fixed transmission rate of 1350 kbp/s. Like the PAL NICAM stereo system, it used near-instantaneous companding (as opposed to Syllabic-companding like the dbx system uses) and non-linear 13-bit digital encoding at a 32 kHz sample rate.

It could also operate in a 48 kHz 16-bit mode. The DANCE system was well documented in numerous NHK technical papers and in a NHK-published book issued in the USA called Hi-Vision Technology.

The DANCE audio codec was superseded by Dolby AC-3 (a.k.a. Dolby Digital), DTS Coherent Acoustics (a.k.a. DTS Zeta 6x20 or ARTEC), MPEG-1 Layer III (a.k.a. MP3), MPEG-2 Layer I, MPEG-4 AAC and many other audio coders. The methods of this codec are described in the IEEE paper:

== Real world performance issues ==
Unlike traditional, interlaced video where interlacing is done on a line by line basis, showing either odd or even lines of video at any one time, thus requiring 2 fields of video to complete a video frame, MUSE used a four-field dot-interlacing cycle, meaning it took four fields to complete a single MUSE frame, and dot interlacing is interlacing that was done on a pixel by pixel basis, dividing both horizontal and vertical resolution by half to create each field of video, and not in a line by line basis as in traditional interlaced video which reduces only the vertical resolution to create each video field. Thus, in MUSE, only stationary images were transmitted at full resolution. However, as MUSE lowers the horizontal and vertical resolution of material that varies greatly from frame to frame, moving images were blurred. Because MUSE used motion-compensation, whole camera pans maintained full resolution, but individual moving elements could be reduced to only a quarter of the full frame resolution. Because the mix between motion and non-motion was encoded on a pixel-by-pixel basis, it wasn't as visible as most would think. Later, NHK came up with backwards compatible methods of MUSE encoding/decoding that greatly increased resolution in moving areas of the image as well as increasing the chroma resolution during motion. This so-called MUSE-III system was used for broadcasts starting in 1995 and a very few of the last Hi-Vision MUSE LaserDiscs used it (A River Runs Through It is one Hi-Vision LD that used it). During early demonstrations of the MUSE system, complaints were common about the decoder's large size, which led to the creation of a miniaturized decoder.

Shadows and multipath still plague this analog frequency modulated transmission mode.

Japan has since switched to a digital HDTV system based on ISDB, but the original MUSE-based BS Satellite channel 9 (NHK BS Hi-vision) was broadcast until September 30, 2007.

== Cultural and geopolitical impacts ==
Internal reasons inside Japan that led to the creation of Hi-Vision

- (1940s): The NTSC standard (as a 525 line monochrome system) was imposed by the US occupation forces.
- (1950s-1960s): Unlike Canada (that could have switched to PAL), Japan was stuck with the US TV transmission standard regardless of circumstances.
- (1960s-1970s): By the late 1960s many parts of the modern Japanese electronics industry had gotten their start by fixing the transmission and storage problems inherent with NTSC's design.
- (1970s-1980s): By the 1980s there was spare engineering talent available in Japan that could design a better television system.

MUSE, as the US public came to know it, was initially covered in the magazine Popular Science in the mid-1980s. The US television networks did not provide much coverage of MUSE until the late 1980s, as there were few public demonstrations of the system outside Japan.

Because Japan had its own domestic frequency allocation tables (that were more open to the deployment of MUSE) it became possible for this television system to be transmitted by Ku Band satellite technology by the end of the 1980s.

The US FCC in the late 1980s began to issue directives that would allow MUSE to be tested in the US, providing it could be fit into a 6 MHz System M channel.

The Europeans (in the form of the European Broadcasting Union (EBU)) were impressed with MUSE, but could never adopt it because it is a 60 Hz TV system, not a 50 Hz system that is standard in Europe and the rest of the world (outside the Americas and Japan).

The EBU development and deployment of B-MAC, D-MAC and much later on HD-MAC were made possible by Hi-Vision's technical success. In many ways MAC transmission systems are better than MUSE because of the total separation of colour from brightness in the time domain within the MAC signal structure.

Like Hi-Vision, HD-MAC could not be transmitted in 8 MHz channels without substantial modification – and a severe loss of quality and frame rate. A 6 MHz version Hi-Vision was experimented with in the US, but it too had severe quality problems so the FCC never fully sanctioned its use as a domestic terrestrial television transmission standard.

The US ATSC working group that had led to the creation of NTSC in the 1950s was reactivated in the early 1990s because of Hi-Vision's success. Many aspects of the DVB standard are based on work done by the ATSC working group, however most of the impact is in support for 60 Hz (as well as 24 Hz for film transmission) and uniform sampling rates and interoperable screen sizes.

== See also ==
- Analog high-definition television system
- Sony HDVS, analog high definition video equipment
- HD-MAC, a planned high-definition analog video standard in Europe
- Clear-Vision

The analog TV systems these systems were meant to replace:

- SECAM
- NTSC
- PAL

Related standards:

- NICAM-like audio coding is used in the HD-MAC system.
- Chroma subsampling in TV indicated as 4:2:2, 4:1:1 etc...
- ISDB
