= Republic of China Armed Forces Museum =

Museum in Zhongzheng, Taipei, Taiwan

- 國軍歷史文物館
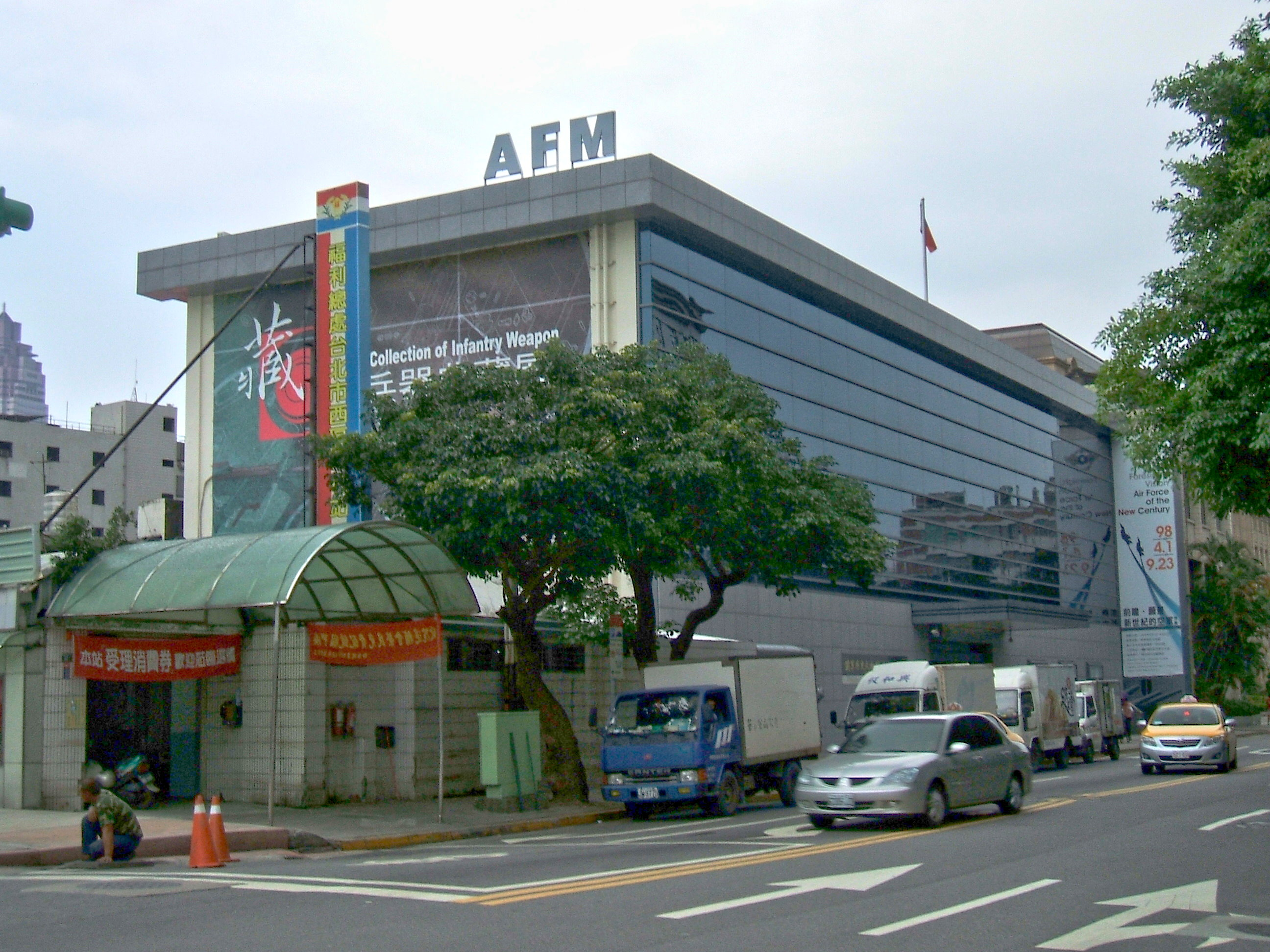
- Established: 31 October 1961
- Dissolved: 30 December 2021
- Location: Zhongzheng, Taipei, Taiwan
- Coordinates: 25.0396°N 121.5081°E
- Type: Military museum

The Republic of China Armed Forces Museum (AFM; Chinese: 國軍歷史文物館; pinyin: Guójūn Lìshǐ Wénwùguǎn) was a museum located on Guiyang Street in the Zhongzheng District of Taipei, Taiwan. It opened on 31 October 1961, under the administration of the Republic of China Ministry of National Defense Department of History and Translation Office. The Museum encompassed 3 floors, and served to preserve and present the heritage and history of the ROC military to the general public.

The museum closed permanently on 30 December 2021, to be replaced by the upcoming National Military Museum.

== Permanent Exhibits ==
- From the Whampoa Army to the Northern Army
- Early Gruelling years in the War of Resistance – Features captured Japanese Military equipment including swords used during the Nanjing Massacre's hundred man killing contest
- Counter Insurgency and Battle of the Taiwan Strait
- Modernization of the Military
- Weapons Collection Room

== Past exhibits ==
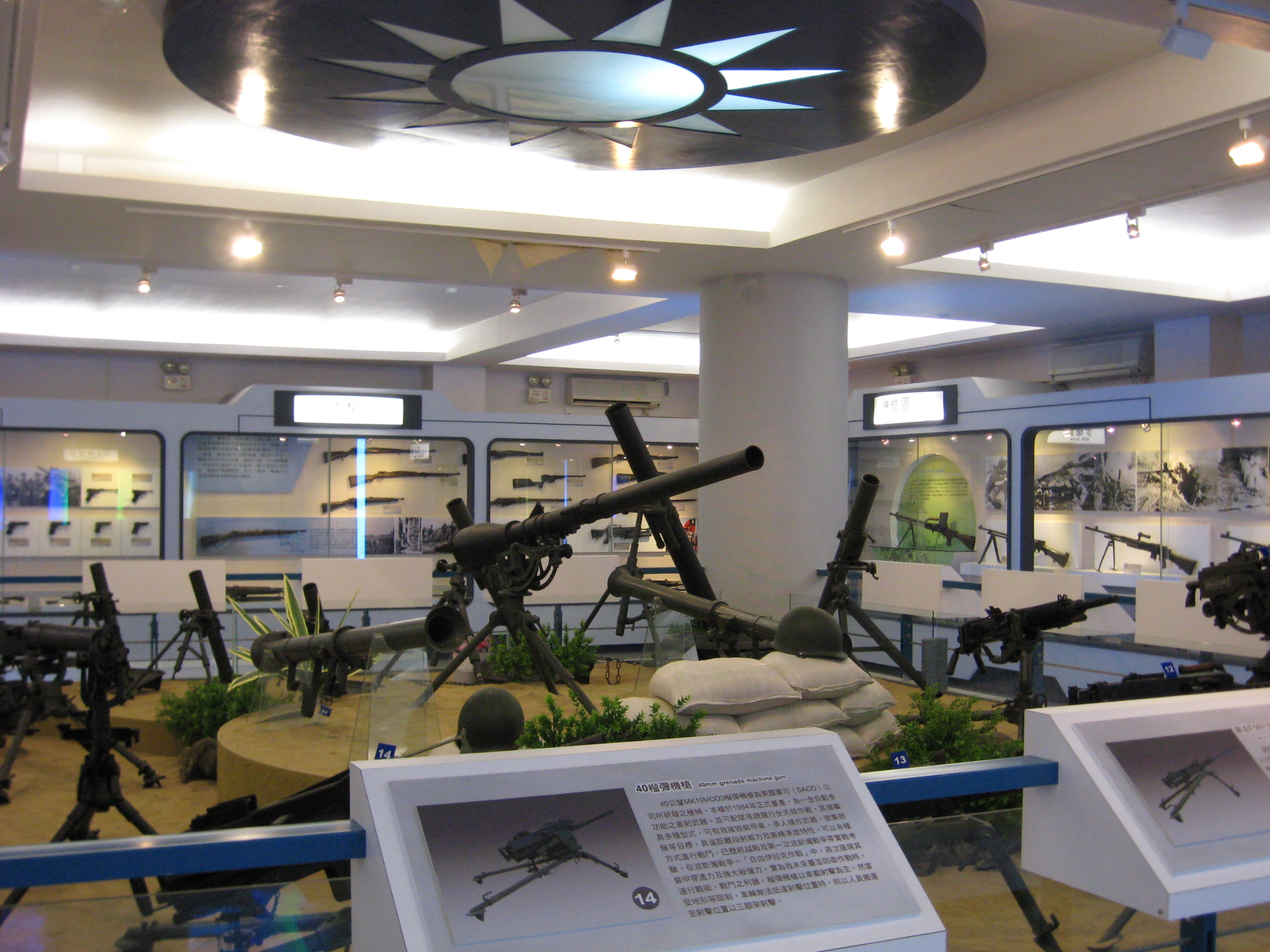
Weapons display exhibition.

- Army Special Operations Aviation Exhibition (2005)
- Japanese Prisoner of War Camps in Taiwan (2005)
- Military Police Special Exhibition (2006)
- Joint logistics exhibition – Armor Vehicles (2007)
- ROC Reserve Command (2008)
- 50th Anniversary of the Second Taiwan Strait Crisis Exhibition (2008)
- ROC Airforce in the New Century – Forward Looking Vision (2009)
- 60th Anniversary of the Battle of Guningtou (2009)
- The Great Wall at Sea – Naval Command Exhibition (2010)
- Black Cat Squadron Exhibition (2010)
- CBRN Defense / Chemical Warfare Corps Exhibition (2012)
- 90th Anniversary of Whampoa Military Academy Exhibition (2014)
- Thunder Tiger Aerobatic Team Exhibition (2014)
- Fidelity of Military Police (2018)

== Incidents ==
In 1999, Chang Fu-chen, a Taiwanese schoolgirl, was raped and murdered at the Armed Forces Museum. Taipei Police found the girl's body dumped in a suburban Taipei park following the confession of Kuo Ching-ho, a military guard at the museum who was serving his compulsory two-year military service.

== Transportation ==
The museum was accessible within walking distance South from Ximen Station of the Taipei Metro.

== See also ==
- List of museums in Taiwan
- Military Museum of the Chinese People's Revolution
- National Museum of History

== External ==
- Armed Forces Museum
