= NHK Twinscam =

Digital video camera developed by NHK

The NHK Twinscam is a digital-optical-mechanical video camera system designed by the Japanese broadcaster NHK for covering aquatic sports events. It uses digital image processing technology to combine video from two synchronized motion-controlled cameras, one above water and one underwater, in real time, to create the illusion of a view from a single camera that can look through air and water at once as if they had the same refractive index.

It was used at the 2012 London Olympics to televise the synchronized swimming events. It has been used for the same purpose in Japan since 2010.
