= Audio Frequency Modulation =

Audio Frequency Modulation (AFM) is an audio recording standard used by Betamax and VHS Hi-Fi stereo, 8mm and Hi8 video systems. AFM is mono on 8mm systems and stereo on Hi8.
