= Video production =

Process of producing video content

Video production is the process of producing video content. It is the equivalent of filmmaking, but with video recorded either as analog signals on videotape, digitally in video tape or as computer files stored on optical discs, hard drives, SSDs, magnetic tape or memory cards instead of film stock.

There are three main stages of video production:

1. Pre-production
2. Production
3. Post-production

Pre-production is the planning phase, in which the project is defined before any footage is recorded. It typically includes writing the script, creating storyboards, developing a budget and shooting schedule, casting performers, scouting locations, and assembling the crew and equipment. The decisions made here determine what will be filmed, how, where, and at what cost; thorough pre-production is generally considered essential to keeping a production on schedule and within budget.

Multi-camera video production setup with a video switcher

Production is the actual recording phase — the moment when the planned material is captured on camera. Crew members film scenes or performances, and the production sound mixer records dialogue and ambient audio. For live or unscripted formats such as news reporting or events, this stage requires capturing usable material in real time, with little opportunity for repetition.

Post-production is everything that happens after recording: the captured material is organized, edited into a coherent sequence, and refined with color correction, sound mixing, music, titles, and visual effects. Editing decisions made at this stage, including what to omit, largely determine the final structure and pacing of the work. Once complete, the finished video is exported into formats suitable for its intended distribution channel, whether broadcast, cinema, disc, or online platforms.

In short: pre-production decides what to make, production captures it, and post-production shapes it into the finished work.

While the stages are sequential, modern digital workflows often allow them to overlap; for example, editors may begin cutting footage while shooting is still underway.

== Television broadcast ==
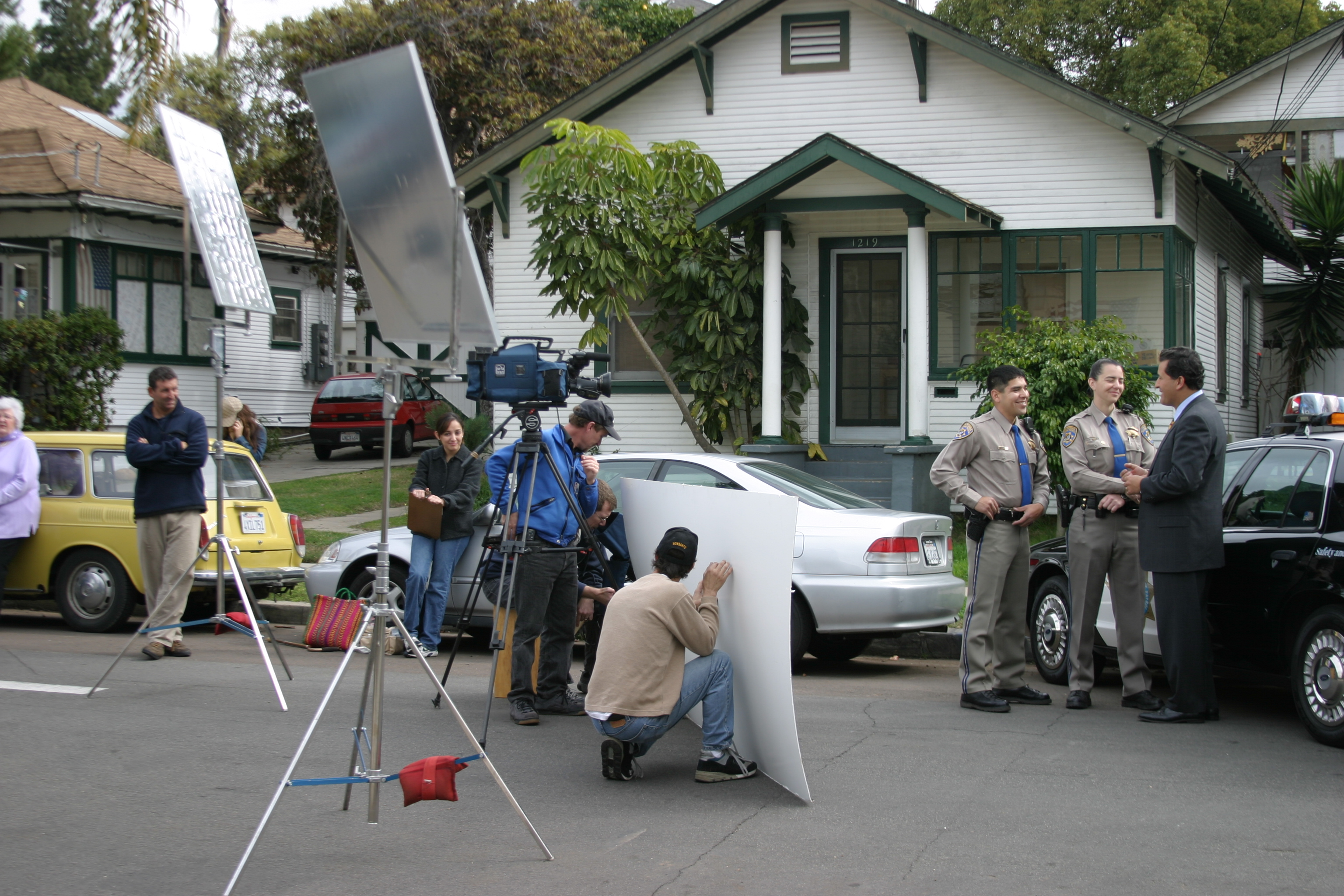
Video production of a political commercial, San Diego, California (2004)

Two styles of producing video are ENG (Electronic news gathering) and EFP (Electronic field production).

== Video production for distance education ==
Video production for distance education is the process of capturing, editing, and presenting educational material specifically for use in on-line education. The process involves scripting, content organization, video capture, and editing to produce educational materials delivered online. It differs from other types of video production in at least three ways:

- It augments traditional teaching tools used in on-line educational programs.
- It may incorporate motion video with sound, computer animations, stills, and other digital media.
- Capture of content may include use of cell phone integrated cameras and extend to commercial high-definition Broadcast quality cameras.

Webcasting is also being used in education for distance learning projects; one innovative use was the DiveLive programs.

== Internet video production ==
A marketing video for the Wikimedia Foundation

Internet video production is the creation of video content intended for distribution over the internet rather than through broadcast or physical media. Its growth since the mid-2000s was enabled by the spread of broadband connections, advances in video compression (notably the H.264 codec, later succeeded by VP9 and AV1), and the launch of video-sharing platforms such as YouTube (2005), which made distribution accessible to individuals and small organizations at little or no cost.

The internet has become the dominant outlet for video consumption. Streaming services deliver professionally produced series and films directly to viewers (see video on demand), while user-generated content— produced largely with smartphones, consumer cameras, and desktop editing software — accounts for a large share of viewing on video-sharing and social media platforms. As of 2022, more than 500 hours of video were uploaded to YouTube every minute, up from about 6 hours per minute in 2007.

Internet distribution has also changed production workflows and economics. Cloud-based editing, storage, and review tools allow distributed teams to collaborate remotely, and livestreaming permits real-time production and audience interaction. The rise of the creator economy — in which individuals produce video professionally and monetize it through advertising revenue sharing, sponsorships, and direct audience payments — has created a production sector along side traditional studios and corporate video departments. More recently,short-form vertical video made for mobile viewing on platforms such as TikTok, Instagram Reels, and YouTube Shorts has driven new formats and production conventions, including rapid editing, on-screen captions, and filming in a 9:16 aspect ratio.

Production budgets for internet video span several orders of magnitude. At the low end, user-generated content can be produced for the cost of a smartphone and consumer editing software, with no marginal distribution cost, while industry pricing guides place semi-professional marketing video at roughly $1,000–$3,000 per finished minute and professional agency productions at $3,000–$20,000 per minute, with major brand campaigns exceeding $100,000. Costs are driven primarily by labor — in the United States, the median annual wage for film and video editors was $75,420 in May 2025 — and scale with crew size, equipment, locations, talent, and post-production time. At the high end, internet-native creators have adopted budgets comparable to traditional film and television production: Bloomberg reported in 2025 that the YouTuber Mr.Beast spends $3 million to$4 million producing a single video.

== See Also ==
- B-roll
- List of video topics
- Television studies
