= PO KSI =

Coordinates: 55.7875°N 37.6357°E

- Native name: АНО «ПО КСИ»
- Company type: Autonomous Non-profit Organization
- Industry: Engineering, electronics
- Founded: 1990
- Headquarters: Moscow, Russia
- Area served: Russia
- Key people: Maksimyak Sergej Petrovich (Director)
- Products: ArVid
- Number of employees: ~200
- Website: poksi.ru

The Professional Association of Designers of Data Processing Systems (Russian: Автономная некоммерческая организация «Профессиональное объединение конструкторов систем информатики), abbreviated PO KSI, (Russian: АНО «ПО КСИ»), is a Russian company. Founded as a venture engineering firm in 1990, it performs research and development, producing high tech devices for government and corporate clients.

PO KSI creates microelectronics, digital microcircuitry, electronic optical sensors and scanners, specialty computer systems, digital cartography, photogrammetry, and geographic information systems. The company has completed 26 development projects and four research projects. It has developed and produced over 30 serial devices and systems.

PO KSI registered as a company on 10 April 2000 and employs over 200 people. Most of the firm's employees are graduates of Moscow's National Research University of Electronic Technology.

The Russian Ministry of Defense is the company's primary client, with contracts for 54 million rubles in 2013 and 93 million rubles in 2015. The company has also fulfilled contracts for Russian aerospace company Tupolev for 531 million rubles and the State Scientific Research Testing Institute of Military Medicine for 120.14 mln. Their central office is located at Lazurnaya 3, Andreevka village, District of Solnechnogorsk, Moscow region, 141551.

In December 2016 PO KSI was sanctioned by the United States for aiding the cyber operations of the Main Intelligence Directorate (GRU) by providing the agency specialized training.

== Selected projects ==
- ArVid (1990–1997) — ArVid was a data backup solution using a VHS tape as a storage medium. It was one of the first projects of PO KSI. Over 200,000 devices were produced and sold.
- DS-300 — DS-300 is an image scanner for stacked paper originals (A5 to A3 format) capable of scanning 300 images per minute. The scanners were chosen by the Russian Federal State Statistics Service to process the results of the 2002, 2006 and 2010 Russian Censuses. The device is also used by Rosobrnadzor during the exam.
- Proscan 60030 — The Proscan 60030 is a precision drum scanner for printed copies and lantern slides of topographic and special-purpose maps and city schemes. It provides input with resolution of up to 600 dpi within the frame, geometrical precision. The scanner was developed in 1999 and 2000. More than 200 devices have been produced since 2000.
- SIB — SIB is an optical ballot scanner that uses image contact sensors and has a resolution of 200 dpi. PO KSI developed and produced over 10,000 SIB scanners for the Russian government.
- OSDCAM — PO KSI has developed digital aerial cameras since 1999. To comply with the Treaty on Open Skies, Russia's Ministry of Defence contracted with PO KSI to produce surveillance equipment fitted on Tu-154 LK-1 and AN-30B planes.

== Directors ==
- Director - Maksimyak Sergey Petrovich
- Associate Director - Tsoi Galina Yurievna
