= ArVid =

Adaptation of VHS for data storage

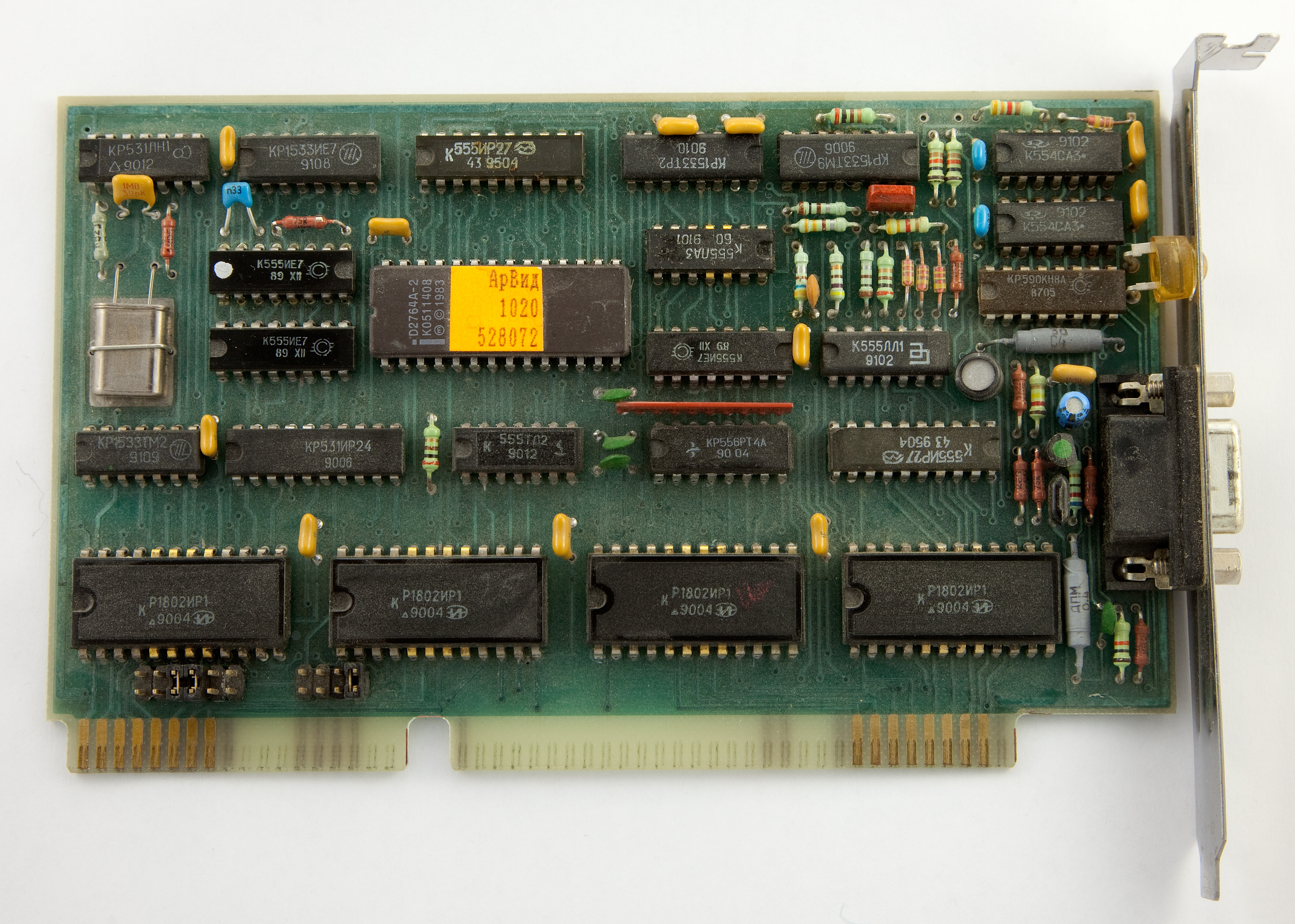
ArVid 1020

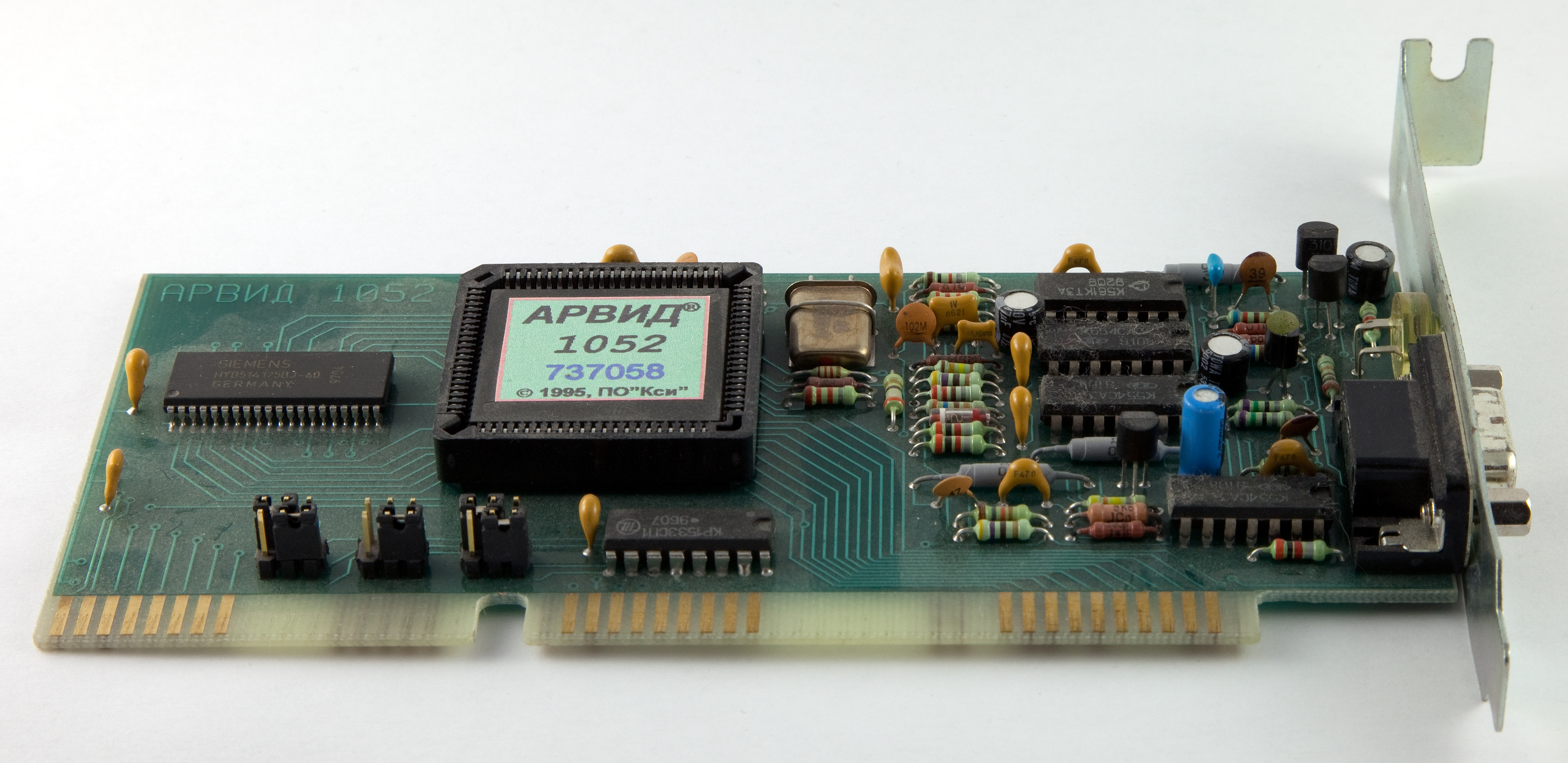
ArVid 1052

ArVid (Archiver on Video) (Russian: АрВид, Архиватор на Видео) was a data backup solution using a VHS tape as a storage medium. It was very popular in Russia and the rest of the former USSR in the mid-1990s.

It was produced in Zelenograd, Russia by PO KSI.

== Features ==
- Using low-cost VHS tapes and recording units for data backup.
- High reliability
- Hamming code error correction
- Easy data copying between two VHS units (eliminating need of a computer for data copying)

== Disadvantages ==
- Inefficient tape capacity usage (only 2 grades of luminance signal spectrum were used)
- Poor software support

== Operation ==
A VHS recorder unit should be connected to an ArVid ISA board by a composite video cable. Unit operation is controlled by a remote control emulator using an LED.

Device may operate in two modes: low data rate at 200 KB/s and high data rate at 325 KB/s (equivalent to roughly 1.33× and 2.17× CDR recording speed). The original, lower recording speed was retained as a user option because not all VHS recorders of the time offered sufficient recording quality to reliably support the higher speed.

An E-180 video tape is able to hold 2 GB of uncompressed data at the lower rate, more than sufficient for most PC hard drives of the time. This can be shown by calculating 200 KB/s × 60 s/min × 60 min/h × 3 h = 2.06 GB (2.06 × 2^{30} bytes), which also leaves a few minutes spare for header and synchronisation space.

Note that it is unclear here whether "200 kbyte" means 200000 (200 × 10^{3}) or 204800 (200 × 2^{10}); the above calculation assumes the latter, but the former still produces a capacity of 2.01 GB (2.01 × 2^{30} bytes), providing 2.00 GB of capacity in a little under 2 hours and 59 minutes. Similarly, this means that an E240 4-hour tape, using the higher data rate, would be capable of storing between 4.35 and 4.46 GB (2^{30} bytes), approximately equivalent to a standard single-layer recordable DVD.

== Models ==
- ArVid 1010, 100 kbyte/s, 4 kbyte RAM, was first of ArVid devices. Its production started in 1992.
- ArVid 1020, 200 kbyte/s, no RAM, was a successor to ArVid 1010 using more advanced integrated circuitry.
- ArVid 1030/1031, 200 kbyte/s, 64 kbyte RAM, had better internal design, less power consumption, was smaller in size and was made using CPLD. It allowed automatic switching to a TV set when device was not in use.
- ArVid 1051/1052, 325 kbyte/s, 128/512 kbyte RAM
