= VHS =

Analog videocassette recording format

Video Home System

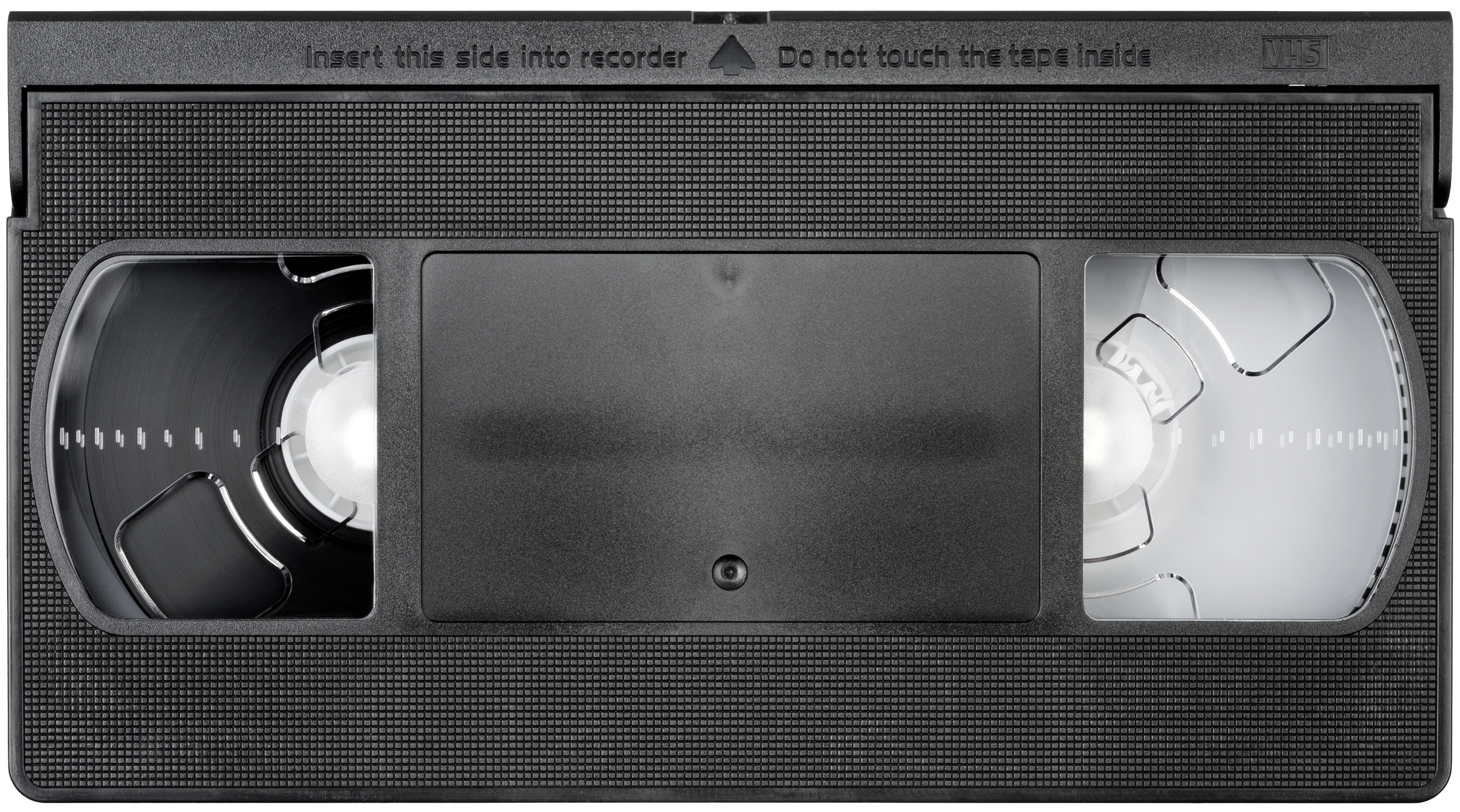
- Top view of a VHS videocassette
- Media type: Magnetic cassette tape, ½-inch (12.7mm)
- Encoding: FM on magnetic tape; NTSC, PAL, SECAM, MESECAM; 525 lines; 625 lines
- Capacity: In minutes. Common for PAL: 120, 180, 240. Common for NTSC: 120, 160.
- Read mechanism: Helical scan
- Write mechanism: Helical scan
- Developed by: JVC
- Dimensions: 18.7 × 10.2 × 2.5 cm (7 3/8 × 4 × 1 inch)
- Usage: Home video and home movies (replaced by DVD and Blu-ray), TV recordings (replaced by DVR) (successor to cassette tape)
- Extended from: Compact Cassette
- Extended to: VHS-C · S-VHS · W-VHS · D-VHS
- Released: September 9, 1976; 50 years ago (Japan); August 23, 1977; 49 years ago (United States)
- Discontinued: 2006 (pre-recorded VHS tapes); 2016 (players officially, some VHS still occasionally made); 2019 (blank VHS tapes)

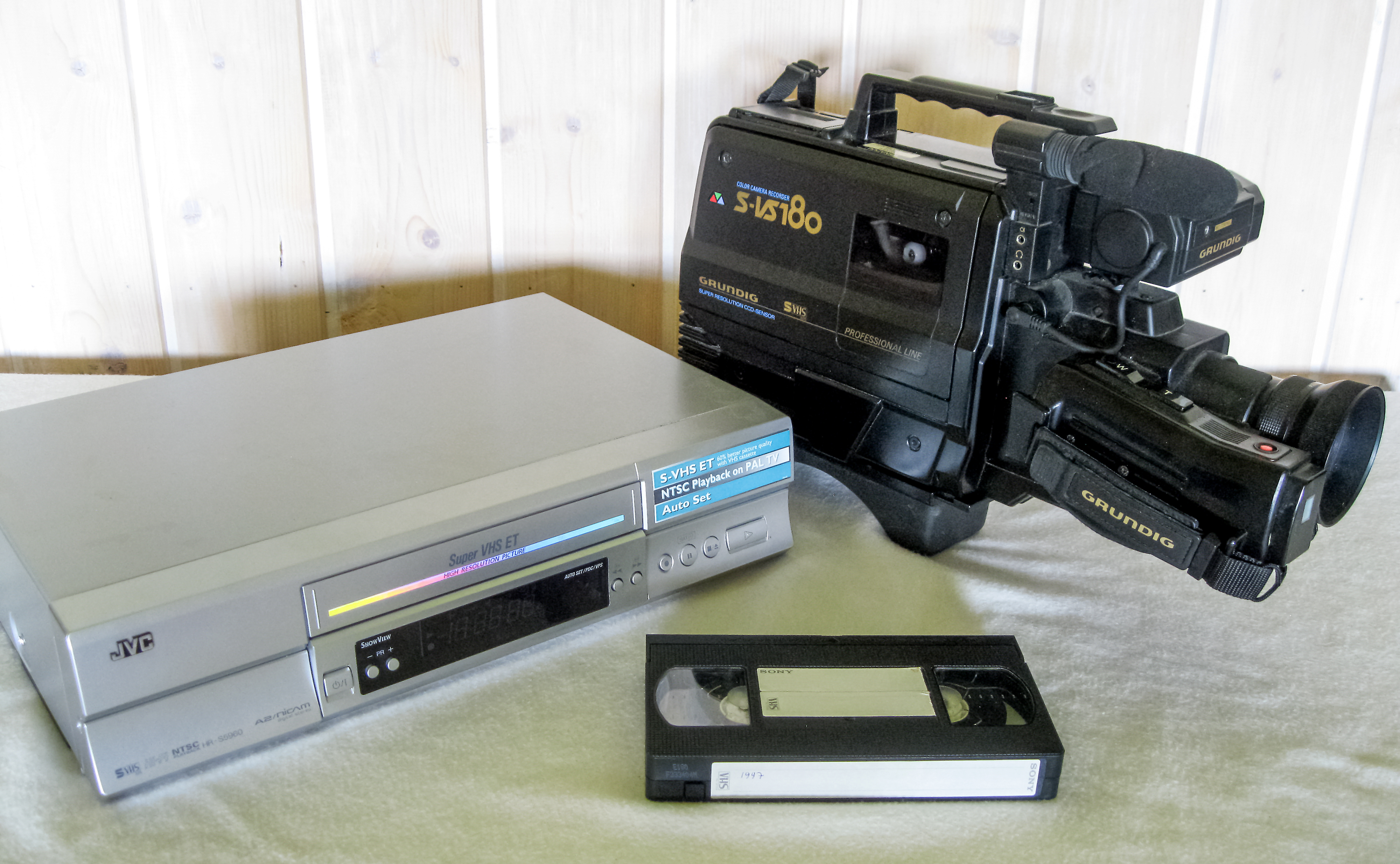
S VHS Recorder, Camcorder & Cassette

VHS (Video Home System) is a discontinued standard for consumer-level analog video recording on tape cassettes, introduced on September 9, 1976 by the Victor Company of Japan (JVC, a subsidiary of Matsushita). It was the dominant home video format throughout the tape media period of the 1980s and 1990s.

Magnetic tape video recording was adopted by the television industry in the 1950s in the form of the first commercialized video tape recorders (VTRs), but the devices were expensive and used only in professional environments. In the 1970s, videotape technology became affordable for home use, and widespread adoption of videocassette recorders (VCRs) began; the VHS became the most popular media format for VCRs as it would win the "format war" against Betamax (backed by Sony) and a number of other competing tape standards.

The cassettes themselves use a 0.5-inch (12.7 mm) magnetic tape between two spools and typically offer a capacity of at least two hours. The popularity of VHS was intertwined with the rise of the video rental market, when films were released on pre-recorded videotapes for home viewing. Newer improved tape formats such as S-VHS were later developed, as well as the earliest optical disc format, LaserDisc; the lack of global adoption of these formats increased VHS's lifetime, which eventually peaked and started to decline in the late 1990s after the introduction of DVD, a digital optical disc format. VHS rentals were surpassed by DVD in the United States in 2003.

Although DVD had already replaced VHS as the primary format for new releases, VHS remained common in many households due to large existing tape collections. Combo units allowed playback of both VHS tapes and DVDs in a single device and served as a transitional technology between the two formats. In addition to playback, some consumers still used VHS tapes to record television programs and home videos, although the practice was in decline. which eventually became the preferred low-end method of movie distribution. For home recording purposes, VHS and VCRs were surpassed by (typically hard disk–based) digital video recorders (DVR) in the 2000s. Production of all VHS equipment ceased by 2016, although the format has since gained some niche popularity amongst collectors and This Is How The World Ends (2026) became the first straight-to-VHS release in 20 years.

== History ==
=== Before VHS ===
In 1956, after several attempts by other companies, the first commercially successful VTR, the Ampex VRX-1000, was introduced by Ampex Corporation. At a price of US$50,000 in 1956 (equivalent to $592,000 in 2025) and US$300 (equivalent to $3,600 in 2025) for a 90-minute reel of tape, it was intended only for the professional market.

Kenjiro Takayanagi, a television broadcasting pioneer then working for JVC as its vice president, saw the need for his company to produce VTRs for the Japanese market at a more affordable price. In 1959, JVC developed a two-head video tape recorder and, by 1960, a color version for professional broadcasting. In 1964, JVC released the DV220, which would be the company's standard VTR until the mid-1970s.

In 1969, JVC collaborated with Sony and Matsushita Electric (Matsushita was the majority stockholder of JVC until 2011) to build a video recording standard for the Japanese consumer. The effort produced the U-matic format in 1971, which was the first cassette format to become a unified standard for different companies. It was preceded by the reel-to-reel 1/2-inch EIAJ format.

The U-matic format was successful in businesses and some broadcast television applications, such as electronic news-gathering, and was produced by all three companies until the late 1980s, but because of cost and limited recording time, very few of the machines were sold for home use. Therefore, soon after the U-matic release, all three companies started working on new consumer-grade video recording formats of their own. Sony started working on Betamax, Matsushita started working on VX, and JVC released the CR-6060 in 1975, based on the U-matic format.

=== VHS development ===
In 1971, JVC engineers Yuma Shiraishi and Shizuo Takano put together a team to develop a VTR for consumers.

By the end of 1971, they created an internal diagram, "VHS Development Matrix", which established twelve objectives for JVC's new VTR; among them:

- The system must be compatible with any ordinary television set.
- Picture quality must be similar to a normal air broadcast.
- The tape must have at least a two-hour recording capacity.
- Tapes must be interchangeable between machines.
- The overall system should be versatile, meaning it can be scaled and expanded, such as connecting a video camera, or dubbing between two recorders.
- Recorders should be affordable, easy to operate, and have low maintenance costs.
- Recorders must be capable of being produced in high volume, their parts must be interchangeable, and they must be easy to service.

In early 1972, the commercial video recording industry in Japan took a financial hit. JVC cut its budgets and restructured its video division, shelving the VHS project. However, despite the lack of funding, Takano and Shiraishi continued to work on the project in secret. By 1973, the two engineers had produced a functional prototype.

=== Competition with Betamax ===
In 1974, the Japanese Ministry of International Trade and Industry (MITI), desiring to avoid consumer confusion, attempted to force the Japanese video industry to standardize on just one home video recording format. Later, Sony had a functional prototype of the Betamax format, and was very close to releasing a finished product. With this prototype, Sony persuaded the MITI to adopt Betamax as the standard, and allow it to license the technology to other companies.

JVC believed that an open standard, with the format shared among competitors without licensing the technology, was better for the consumer. To prevent the MITI from adopting Betamax, JVC worked to convince other companies, in particular Matsushita (Japan's largest electronics manufacturer at the time, marketing its products under the National brand in most territories and the Panasonic brand in North America, and JVC's majority stockholder), to accept VHS, and thereby work against Sony and the MITI. Matsushita agreed, fearing Sony would dominate the market with a Betamax monopoly. Matsushita also regarded Betamax's one-hour recording time limit as a disadvantage.

Matsushita's backing of JVC persuaded Hitachi, Mitsubishi, and Sharp to back the VHS standard as well. Sony's release of its Betamax unit to the Japanese market in 1975 placed further pressure on the MITI to side with the company. However, the collaboration of JVC and its partners was much stronger, which eventually led the MITI to drop its push for an industry standard. JVC released the first VHS machines in Japan in late 1976, and in the United States in mid-1977.

Sony's Betamax competed with VHS throughout the late 1970s and into the 1980s (see: Videotape format war). Betamax's major advantages were its smaller cassette size, theoretical higher video quality, and earlier availability, but its shorter recording time proved to be a major shortcoming.

Originally, Beta I machines using the NTSC television standard were able to record one hour of programming at their standard tape speed of 1.5 inches per second (ips). The first VHS machines could record for two hours, due to both a slightly slower tape speed (1.31 ips) and significantly longer tape. Betamax's smaller cassette limited the size of the reel of tape, and could not compete with VHS's two-hour capability by extending the tape length. Instead, Sony had to slow the tape down to 0.787 ips (Beta II) in order to achieve two hours of recording in the same cassette size. Sony eventually created a Beta III speed of 0.524 ips, which allowed NTSC Betamax to break the two-hour limit, but by then VHS had already won the format battle.

Additionally, VHS had a "far less complex tape transport mechanism" than Betamax, and VHS machines were faster at rewinding and fast-forwarding than their Sony counterparts.

VHS eventually won the war, gaining 60% of the North American market by 1980.

== Initial releases of VHS-based devices ==
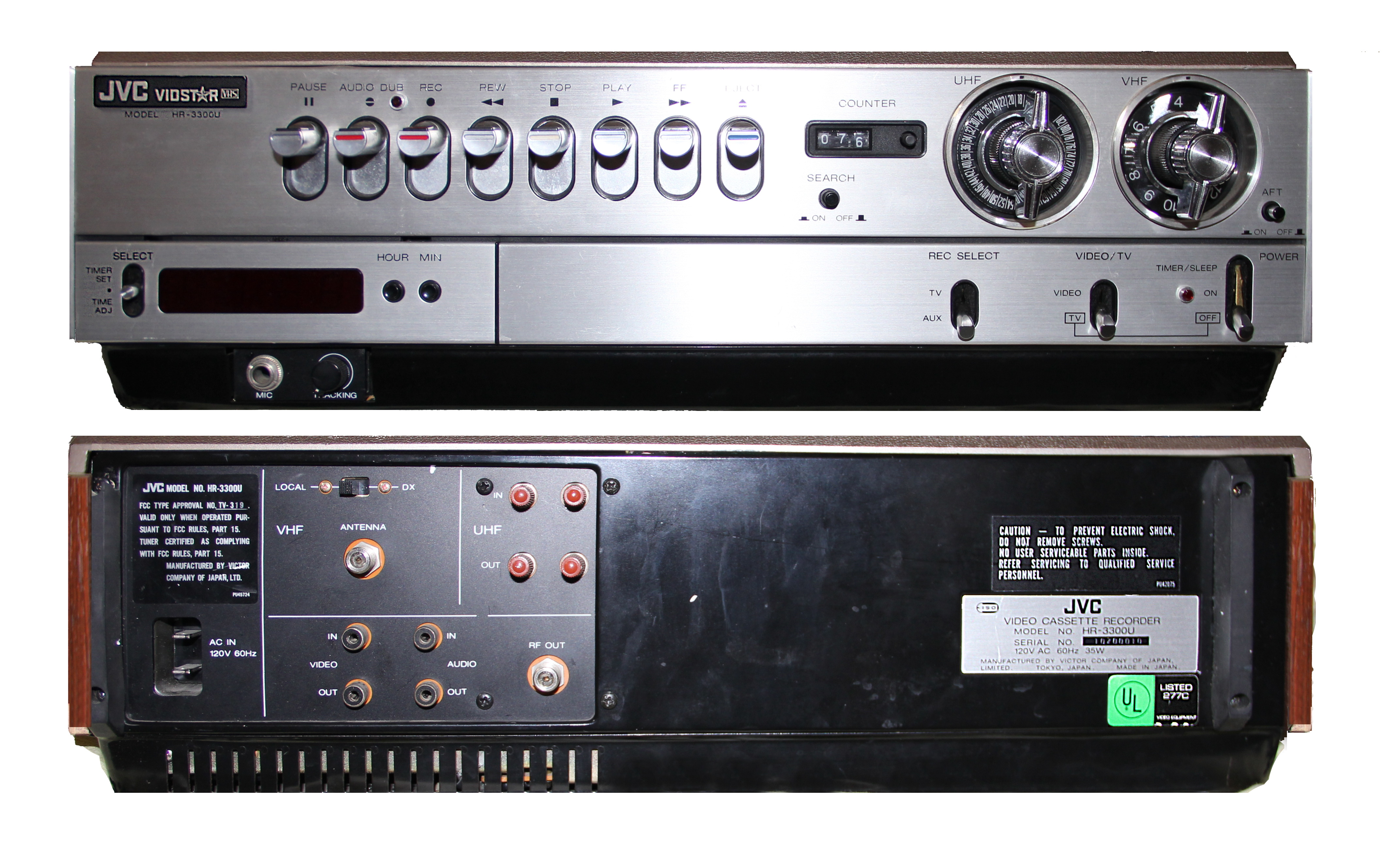
JVC HR-3300U VIDSTAR – the US version of the JVC HR-3300. It is virtually identical to the Japanese version, which showed the "Victor" name, and did not use the "VIDSTAR" name.

The first VCR to use VHS was the Victor HR-3300, and was introduced by the president of JVC in Japan on September 9, 1976. JVC started selling the HR-3300 in Akihabara, Tokyo, Japan, on October 31, 1976. Region-specific versions of the JVC HR-3300 were also distributed later on, such as the HR-3300U in the United States, and the HR-3300EK in the United Kingdom. The United States received its first VHS-based VCR, the RCA VBT200, on August 23, 1977. The RCA unit was designed by Matsushita and was the first VHS-based VCR manufactured by a company other than JVC. It was also capable of recording four hours in LP (long play) mode. The UK received its first VHS-based VCR, the Victor HR-3300EK, in 1978.

Quasar and General Electric followed-up with VHS-based VCRs – all designed by Matsushita. By 1999, Matsushita alone produced just over half of all Japanese VCRs. TV/VCR combos, combining a TV set with a VHS mechanism, were also once available for purchase. Combo units containing both a VHS mechanism and a DVD player were introduced in the late 1990s, and at least one combo unit, the Panasonic DMP-BD70V, included a Blu-ray player.

== Technical details ==
VHS has been standardized in IEC 60774–1.

=== Cassette and tape design ===
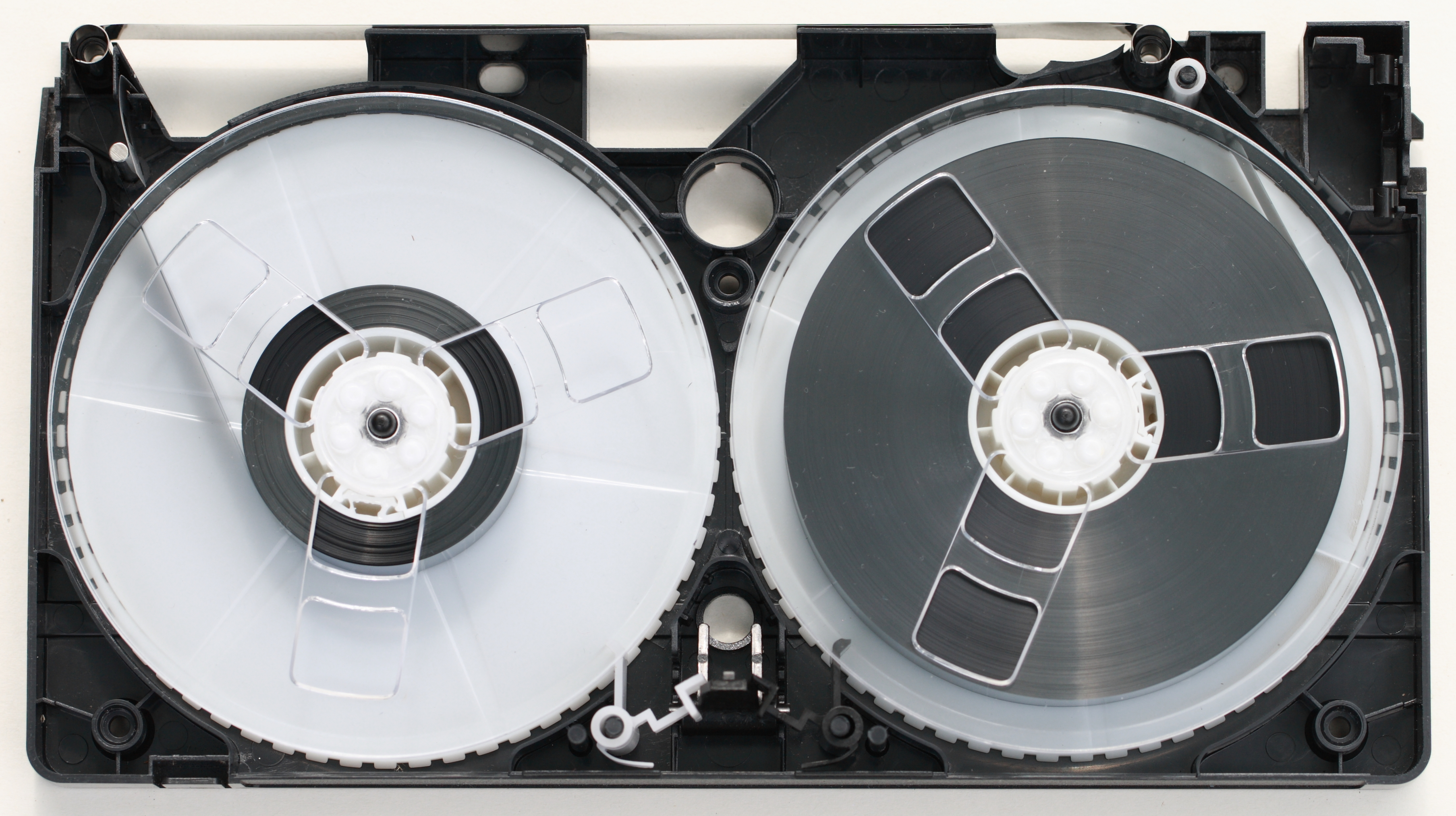
Top view of VHS videocassette with front casing removed

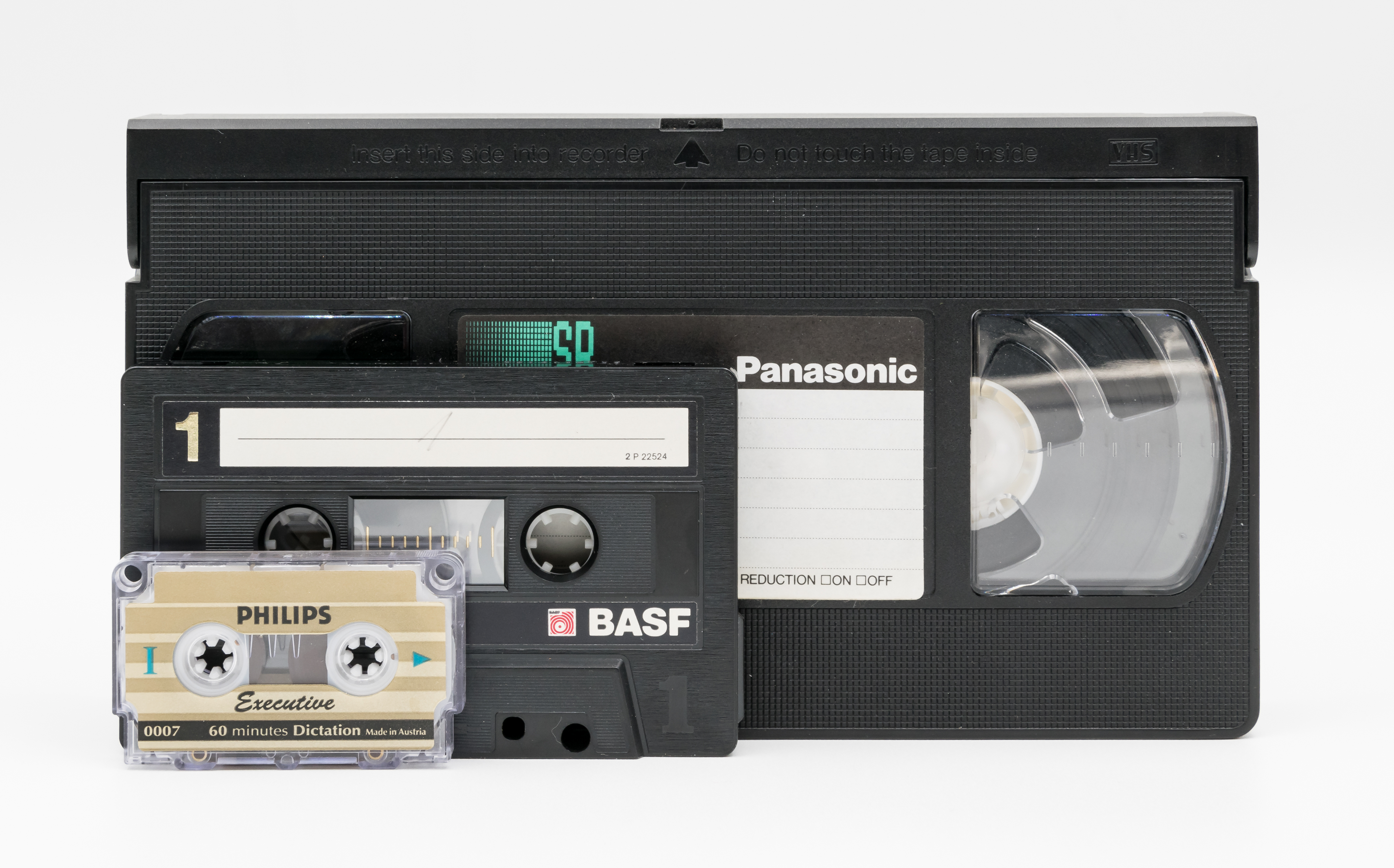
From left to right: Phillips Mini Cassette, Compact Cassette, and VHS

The VHS cassette is a 187 mm wide, 103 mm deep, and 25 mm thick (7 3/8 × 4 1/16× 1 inch) plastic shell held together with five Phillips-head screws. The flip-up cover, which allows players and recorders to access the tape, has a latch on the right side, with a push-in toggle to release it (bottom view image). The cassette has an anti-despooling mechanism, consisting of several plastic parts between the spools, near the front of the cassette (white and black in the top view). The spool latches are released by a push-in lever within a 6.35 mm (1/4 inch) hole at the bottom of the cassette, 19 mm (3/4 inch) in from the edge label. The tapes are made, pre-recorded, and inserted into the cassettes in cleanrooms, to ensure quality and to keep dust from getting embedded in the tape and interfering with recording (both of which could cause signal dropouts)

There is a clear tape leader at both ends of the tape to provide an optical auto-stop for the VCR transport mechanism. In the VCR, a light source is inserted into the cassette through the circular hole in the center of the underside, and two photodiodes are on the left and right sides of where the tape exits the cassette. When the clear tape reaches one of these, enough light will pass through the tape to the photodiode to trigger the stop function; some VCRs automatically rewind the tape when the trailing end is detected. Early VCRs used an incandescent bulb as the light source: when the bulb failed, the VCR would act as if a tape were present when the machine was empty, or would detect the blown bulb and completely stop functioning. Later designs use an infrared LED, which has a much longer life.

The recording medium is a Mylar magnetic tape, 12.7 mm (1/2 inch) wide, coated with metal oxide, and wound on two spools. VHS tapes stored next to magnetic materials can become damaged or distorted due to the disruption of the oxide particles.

The tape speed for "Standard Play" mode (see below) is 3.335 cm/s (1.313 ips) for NTSC, 2.339 cm/s (0.921 ips) for PAL—or just over 2.0 and 1.4 metres (6 ft 6.7 in and 4 ft 7.2 in) per minute respectively. The tape length for a T-120 VHS cassette is 247.5 metres (812 ft).

=== Tape loading technique ===
VHS M-loading system

As with almost all cassette-based videotape systems, VHS machines pull the tape out of the cassette shell and wrap it around the inclined head drum, which rotates at 1,798.2 RPM in NTSC machines and at 1,500 rpm for PAL, one complete rotation of the head corresponding to one video frame. VHS uses an "M-loading" system, also known as M-lacing, where the tape is drawn out by two threading posts and wrapped around more than 180 degrees of the head drum (and also other tape transport components) in a shape roughly approximating the letter M. The heads in the rotating drum may get their signal through slip rings or wirelessly using a rotary transformer.

=== Recording capacity ===
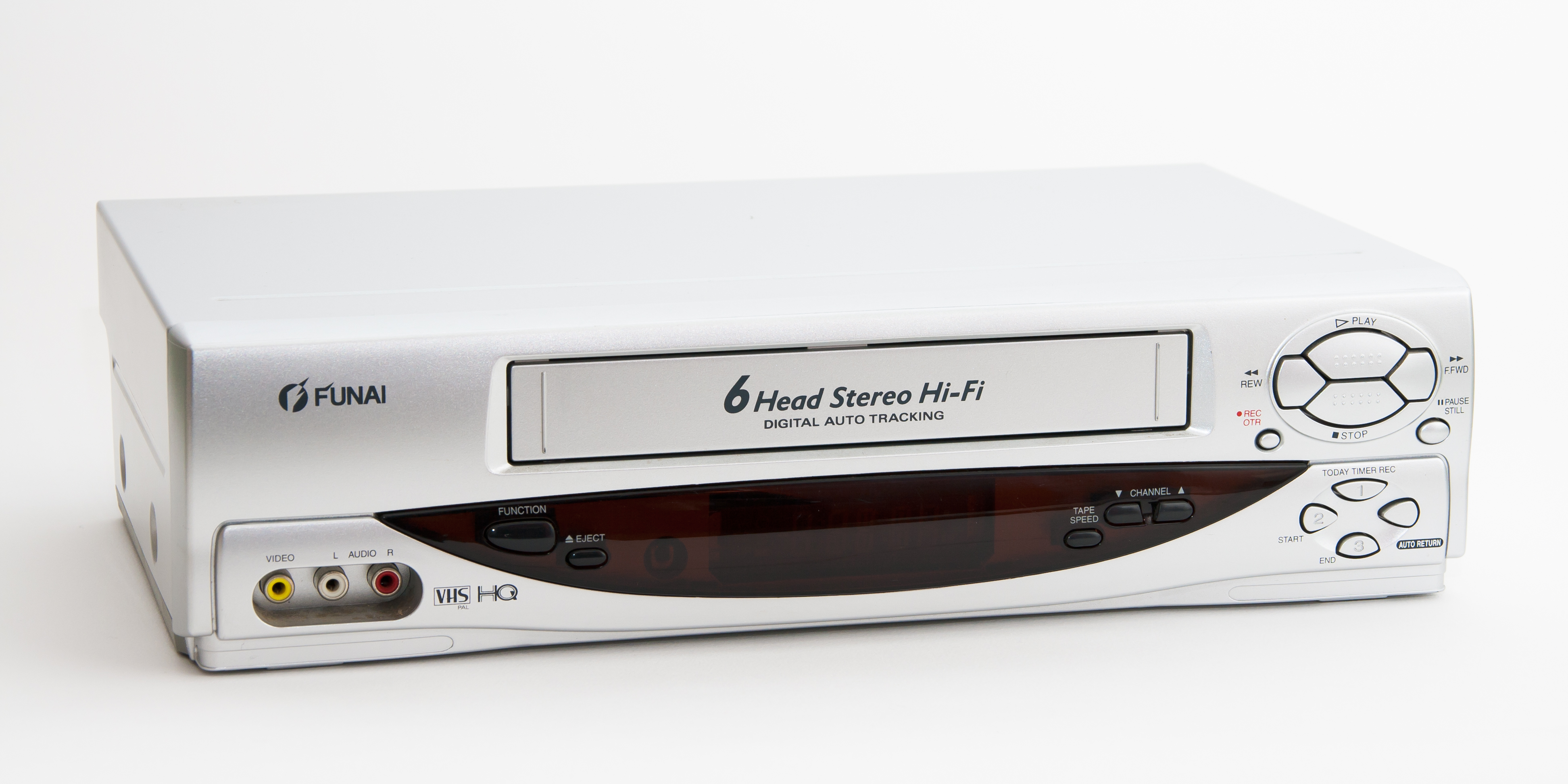
A late 2000s VHS VCR by Funai

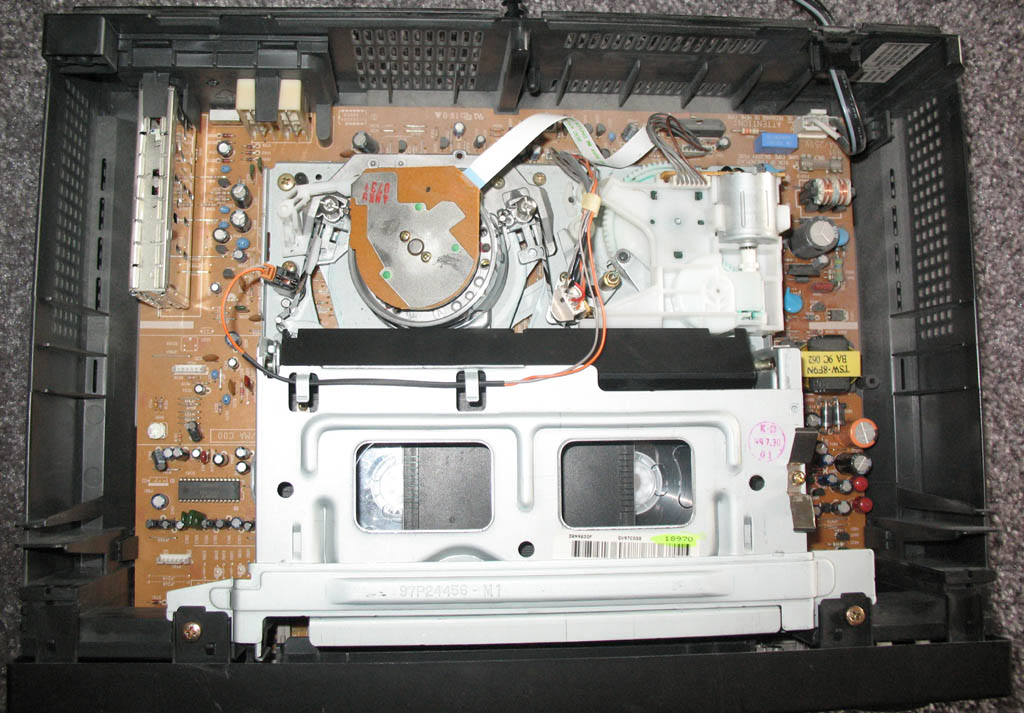
The interior of a late-generation VHS VCR showing the drum and tape

A VHS cassette holds a maximum of about 430 m (1,410 ft) of tape at the lowest acceptable tape thickness, giving a maximum playing time of about four hours in a T-240/DF480 for NTSC and five hours in an E-300 for PAL at "standard play" (SP) quality. More frequently, however, VHS tapes are thicker than the required minimum to avoid complications such as jams or tears in the tape. Other speeds include "long play" (LP), "extended play" (EP) or "super long play" (SLP) (standard on NTSC; rarely found on PAL machines). LP and EP/SLP double and triple the recording time respectively, but these speed reductions cause a reduction in horizontal resolution – from the normal equivalent of 250 vertical lines in SP, to the equivalent of 230 in LP and even fewer in EP/SLP.

Due to the nature of recording diagonally from a spinning drum, the actual write speed of the video heads does not get slower when the tape speed is reduced. Instead, the video tracks become narrower and are packed closer together. This results in noisier playback that can be more difficult to track correctly: The effect of subtle misalignment is magnified by the narrower tracks. The heads for linear audio are not on the spinning drum, so for them, the tape speed from one reel to the other is the same as the speed of the heads across the tape. This speed is quite slow: for SP it is about 2/3s that of an audio cassette, and for EP it is slower than the slowest microcassette speed. This is widely considered inadequate for anything but basic voice playback, and was a major liability for VHS-C camcorders that encouraged the use of the EP speed. Color depth deteriorates significantly at lower speeds in PAL: often, a color image on a PAL tape recorded at low speed is displayed only in monochrome, or with intermittent color, when playback is paused.

=== Tape lengths ===
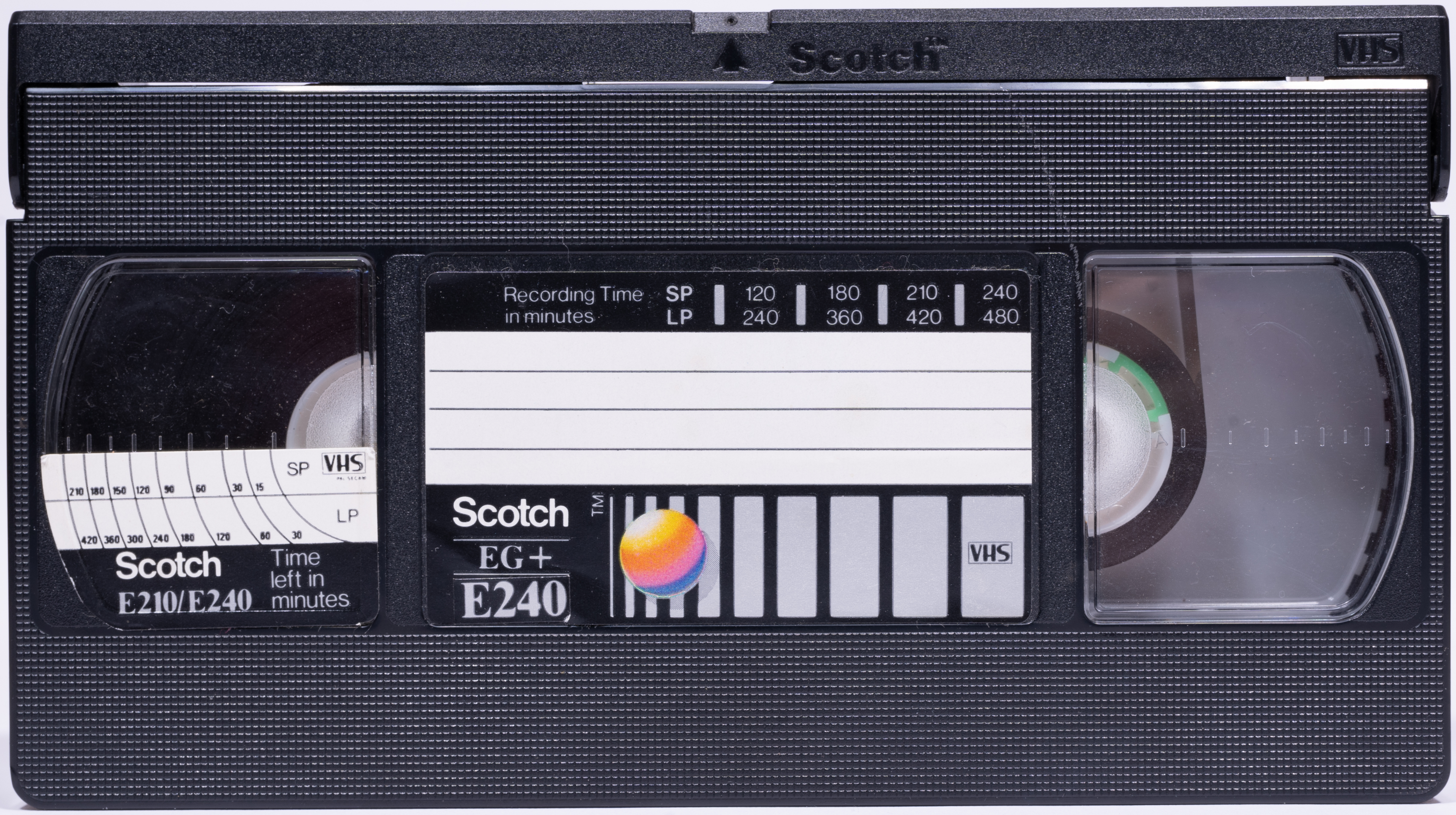
VHS cassette with time scale for SP and LP

VHS cassettes for NTSC and PAL/SECAM systems are physically identical, although the signals recorded on the tape are incompatible. The tape speeds are different too, so the playing time for any given cassette will vary between the systems. To avoid confusion, manufacturers indicate the playing time in minutes that can be expected for the market the tape is sold in: E-XXX indicates playing time in minutes for PAL or SECAM. T-XXX indicates playing time in minutes for NTSC or PAL-M.

To calculate the playing time for a T-XXX tape in a PAL machine, this formula is used:

PAL/SECAM recording time = T-XXX in minutes × 1.426

To calculate the playing time for an E-XXX tape in an NTSC machine, this formula is used:

NTSC recording time = E-XXX in minutes × 0.701

Since the recording/playback time for PAL/SECAM is roughly 1/3 longer than the recording/playback time for NTSC, some tape manufacturers label their cassettes with both T-XXX and E-XXX marks, like T60/E90, T90/E120 and T120/E180.

SP is standard play, LP is long play (1/2 speed, equal to recording time in DVHS "HS" mode), EP/SLP is extended/super long play (1/3 speed) which was primarily released into the NTSC market. Some later Panasonic DVD combo models such as the SA-HT820V supported VP (very long play) recording, equal to 1/5 speed of SP.

Common tape types, approximate
Label; nominal length (minutes)	Length		Recording time, NTSC				Recording time, PAL		
Label; nominal length (minutes)	(m)	(ft)	SP	LP	EP/SLP	VP	SP	LP	EP/SLP
NTSC market
T-20	44	145	20 min	40 min	60 min (1h)	100 min (1h 40)	28.52 min	57.04 min	85.56 min (1h 25.56)
T-30 (typical VHS-C)	63	207	30 min	60 min (1h)	90 min (1h 30)	150 min (2h 30)	42.78 min	85.56 min (1h 25.56)	128.34 min (2h 8.34)
T-45	94	310	45 min	90 min (1h 30)	135 min (2h 15)	225 min (3h 45)	64.17 min (1h 04.17)	128.34 min (2h 8.34)	192.51 min (3h 12.51)
T-60	126	412	60 min (1h)	120 min (2h)	180 min (3h)	300 min (5h)	85.56 min (1h 25.56)	171.12 min (2h 51.12)	256.68 min (4h 16.68)
T-90	186	610	90 min (1h 30)	180 min (3h)	270 min (4h 30)	450 min (7h 30)	128.34 min (2h 8.34)	256.68 min (4h 16.68)	385.02 min (6h 25.02)
T-120 / DF-240	247	811	120 min (2h)	240 min (4h)	360 min (6h)	600 min (10h)	176 min (2h 56)	342.24 min (5h 42.24)	513.36 min (8h 33.36)
T-130	277	910	130 min (2h 10)	260 min (4h 20)	390 min (6h 30)	650 min (10h 50)	185.38 min (3h 5.38)	370.76 min (6h 10.76)	556.14 min (9h 16.14)
T-140	287.5	943	140 min (2h 20)	280 min (4h 40)	420 min (7h)	700 min (11h 40)	199.64 min (3h 19.64)	399.28 min (6h 39.28)	598.92 min (9h 58.92)
T-150 / DF-300	316.5	1,040	150 min (2h 30)	300 min (5h)	450 min (7h 30)	750 min (12h 30)	213.9 min (3h 33.9)	427.8 min (7h 7.8)	641.7 min (10h 41.7)
T-160	328	1,075	160 min (2h 40)	320 min (5h 20)	480 min (8h)	800 min (13h 20)	228.16 min (3h 48.16)	456.32 min (7h 36.32)	684.48 min (11h 24.48)
T-180 / DF-360	369	1,210	180 min (3h)	360 min (6h)	540 min (9h)	900 min (15h)	256.68 min (4h 16.68)	513.36 min (8h 33.36)	770.04 min (12h 50.04)
T-200	410	1,345	200 min (3h 20)	400 min (6h 40)	600 min (10h)	1000 min (16h 40)	285.2 min (4h 45.2)	570.4 min (9h 30.4)	855.6 min (14h 15.6)
T-210 / DF-420	433	1,420	210 min (3h 30)	420 min (7h)	630 min (10h 30)	1050 min (17h 30)	299.46 min (4h 59.46)	598.92 min (9h 58.92)	898.38 min (14h 58.38)
T-240 / DF-480	500	1,640	240 min (4h)	480 min (8h)	720 min (12h)	1200 min (20h)	342.24 min (5h 42.24)	684.48 min (11h 24)	1026.72 min (17h 6.72)
PAL market
E-30 (typical VHS-C)	45	148	22.5 min	45 min	68 min (1h 08)	113 min (1h 53)	32 min	64 min (1h 04)	96 min (1h 36)
E-60	88	290	44 min	88 min (1h 28)	133 min (2h 13)	220 min (3h 40)	63 min (1h 03)	126 min (2h 06)	189 min (3h 09)
E-90	131	429	65 min (1h 05)	131 min (2h 11)	196 min (3h 16)	325 min (5h 25)	93 min (1h 33)	186 min (3h 06)	279 min (4h 39)
E-120	174	570	87 min (1h 27)	174 min (2h 54)	260 min (4h 20)	435 min (7h 15)	124 min (2h 04)	248 min (4h 08)	372 min (6h 12)
E-150	216	609	108 min (1h 49)	227 min (3h 37)	324 min (5h 24)	540 min (9h)	154 min (2h 34)	308 min (5h 08)	462 min (7h 42)
E-180	259	849	129 min (2h 09)	259 min (4h 18)	388 min (6h 28)	645 min (10h 45)	184 min (3h 04)	369 min (6h 09)	552 min (9h 12)
E-195	279	915	139 min (2h 19)	279 min (4h 39)	418 min (6h 58)	695 min (11h 35)	199 min (3h 19)	397 min (6h 37)	597 min (9h 57)
E-200	289	935	144 min (2h 24)	284 min (4h 44)	428 min (7h 08)	720 min (12h)	204 min (3h 24)	405 min (6h 45)	612 min (10h 21)
E-210	304	998	152 min (2h 32)	304 min (5h 04)	456 min (7h 36)	760 min (12h 40)	217 min (3h 37)	433 min (7h 13)	651 min (10h 51)
E-240	348	1,142	174 min (2h 54)	348 min (5h 48)	522 min (8h 42)	870 min (14h 30)	248 min (4h 08)	496 min (8h 16)	744 min (12h 24)
E-270	392	1,295	196 min (3h 16)	392 min (6h 32)	589 min (9h 49)	980 min (16h 20)	279 min (4h 39)	559 min (9h 19)	837 min (13h 57)
E-300	435	1,427	217 min (3h 37)	435 min (7h 15)	652 min (10h 52)	1085 min (18h 5)	310 min (5h 10)	620 min (10h 20)	930 min (15h 30)

=== Copy protection ===
As VHS was designed to facilitate recording from various sources, including television broadcasts or other VCR units, content producers quickly found that home users were able to use the devices to copy videos from one tape to another. Despite generation loss in quality when a tape was copied, this practice was regarded as a widespread problem, which members of the Motion Picture Association of America (MPAA) claimed caused them great financial losses. In response, several companies developed technologies to protect copyrighted VHS tapes from casual duplication by home users. The most popular method was Analog Protection System, better known simply as Macrovision, produced by a company of the same name. According to Macrovision:

The technology is applied to over 550 million videocassettes annually and is used by every MPAA movie studio on some or all of their videocassette releases. Over 220 commercial duplication facilities around the world are equipped to supply Macrovision videocassette copy protection to rights owners...The study found that over 30% of VCR households admit to having unauthorized copies, and that the total annual revenue loss due to copying is estimated at $370,000,000 annually.

The system was first used in copyrighted movies beginning with the 1984 film The Cotton Club.

Macrovision copy protection saw refinement throughout its years, but has always worked by essentially introducing deliberate errors into a protected VHS tape's output video stream. These errors in the output video stream are ignored by most televisions, but will interfere with re-recording of programming by a second VCR. The first version of Macrovision introduces high signal levels during the vertical blanking interval, which occurs between the video fields. These high levels confuse the automatic gain control circuit in most VHS VCRs, leading to varying brightness levels in an output video, but are ignored by the TV as they are out of the frame-display period. "Level II" Macrovision uses a process called "colorstriping", which inverts the analog signal's colorburst period and causes off-color bands to appear in the picture. Level III protection added additional colorstriping techniques to further degrade the image.

These protection methods worked well to defeat analog-to-analog copying by VCRs of the time. Consumer products capable of digital video recording are mandated by law to include features which detect Macrovision encoding of input analog streams, and disrupt copying of the video. Both intentional and false-positive detection of Macrovision protection has frustrated archivists who wish to copy now-fragile VHS tapes to a digital format for preservation. As of the 2020s, modern software decoding ignores Macrovision as software is not limited to the fixed standards that Macrovision was intended to disrupt in hardware based systems.

== Recording process ==
A close-up process of how the magnetic tape in a VHS cassette is being pulled from the cassette shell to the head drum of the VCR

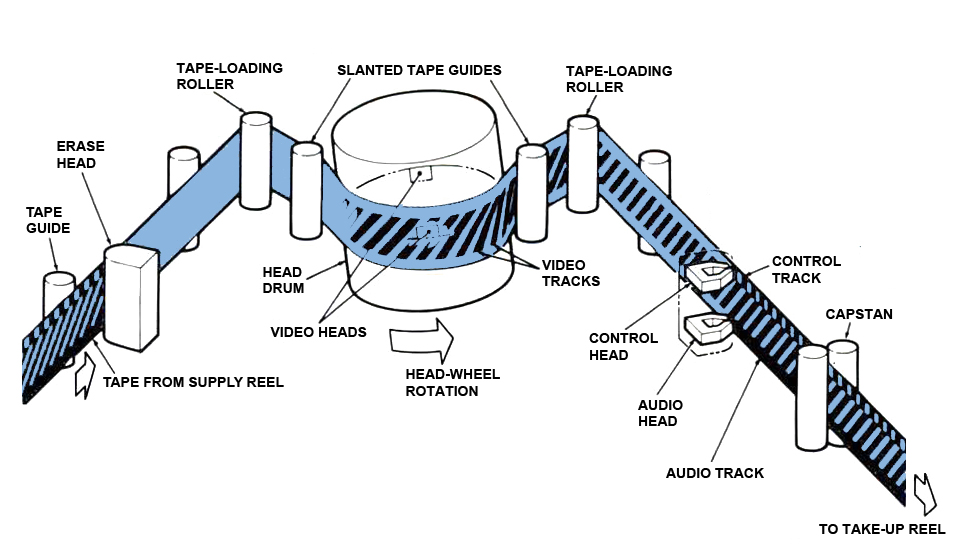
This illustration demonstrates the helical wrap of the tape around the head drum, and shows the points where the video, audio and control tracks are recorded

The recording process in VHS consists of the following steps, in this order:

- The tape is pulled from the supply reel by a capstan and pinch roller, similar to those used in audio tape recorders.
- The tape passes across the erase head, which wipes any existing recording from the tape.
- The tape is wrapped around the head drum, using a little more than 180 degrees of the drum.
- One of the heads on the spinning drum records one field of video onto the tape, in one diagonally oriented track.
- The tape passes across the audio and control head, which records the control track and the linear audio tracks.
- The tape is wound onto the take-up reel due to torque applied to the reel by the machine.

=== Erase head ===
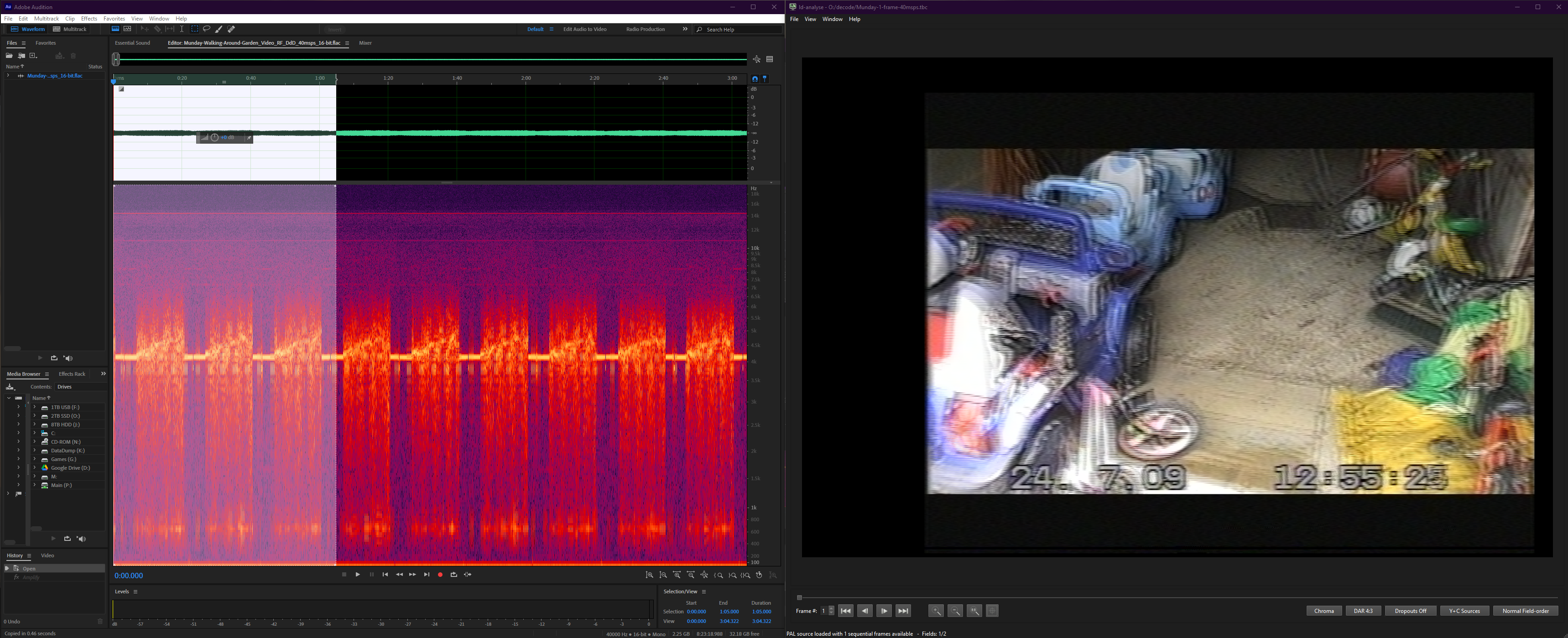
Highlighted selection of a 40msps RAW FM signal captured from a test point on a consumer VCR during playback (left) and its resulting decoded signal image frame or two interlaced fields (right) produced by vhs-decode

The erase head is fed by a high-level, high-frequency AC signal that overwrites any previous recording on the tape. Without this step, the new recording cannot be guaranteed to completely replace any old recording that might have been on the tape.

=== Video recording ===
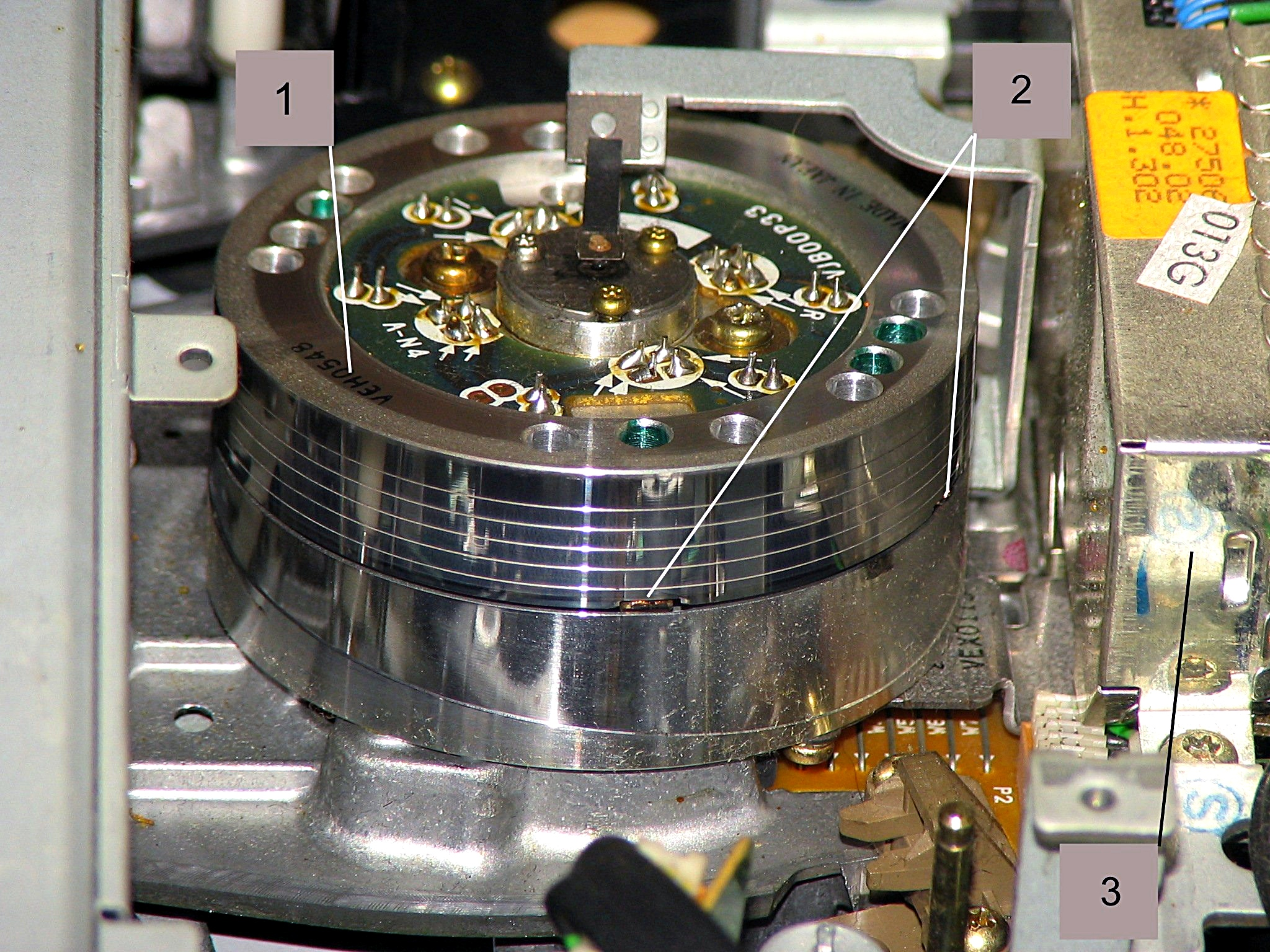
Panasonic Hi-Fi six-head drum VEH0548 installed on G mechanism as an example, demonstrated a typical VHS head drum containing two tape heads. (1) is the upper head, (2) is the tape heads, and (3) is the head amplifier.

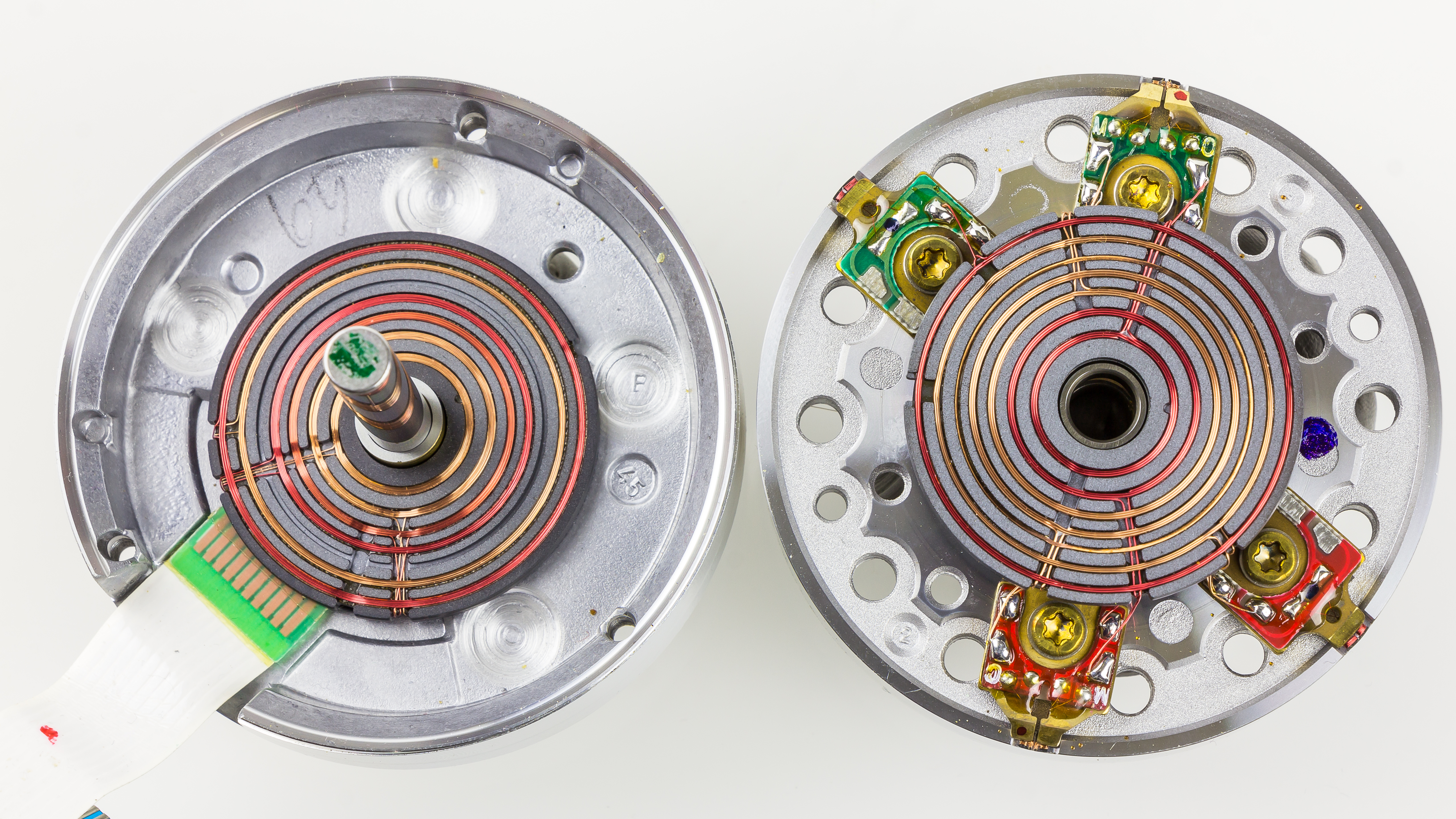
The upper- and underside of a typical four-head VHS head assembly showing the head chips and rotary transformer

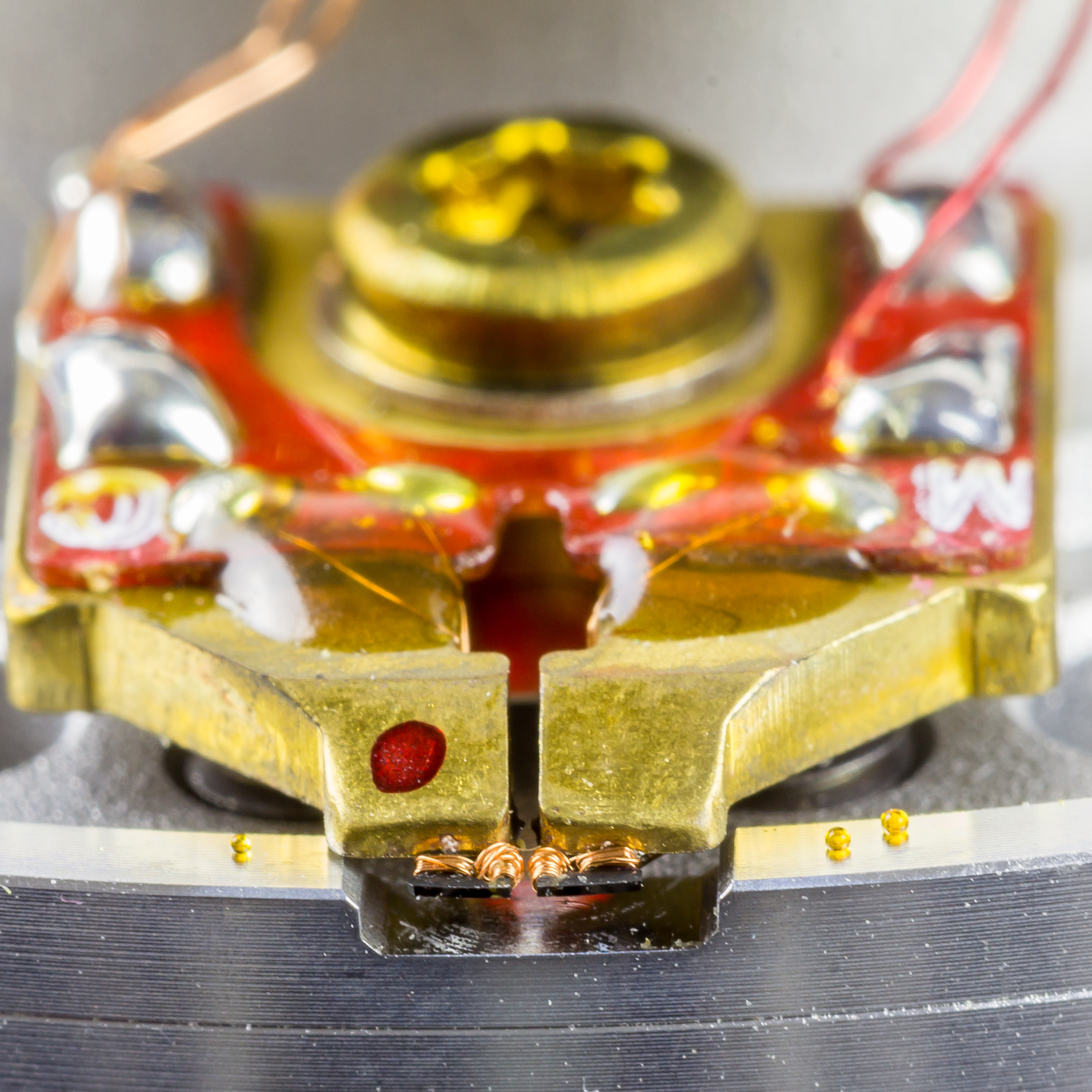
Close-up of a head chip

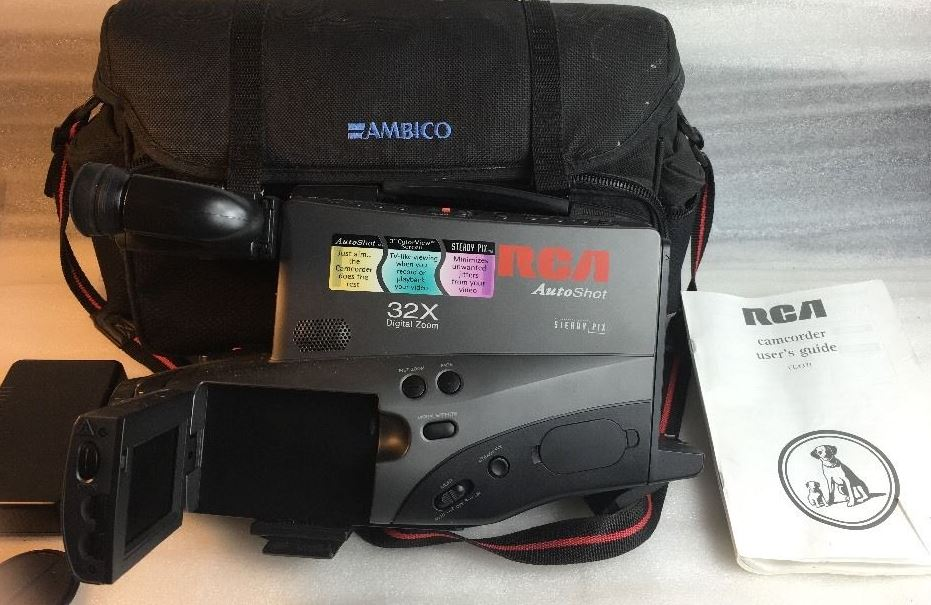
A typical RCA (Model CC-4371) full-size VHS camcorder with a built-in three-inch color LCD screen.

The tape path then carries the tape around the spinning video-head drum, wrapping it around a little more than 180 degrees (called the omega transport system) in a helical fashion, assisted by the slanted tape guides. The head rotates constantly at (Note: The 1800 rpm tape head speed, and corresponding field period time, etc., quoted in this article for NTSC machines are based on the old black and white RS-170 standard. When this was adapted for color under the NTSC standard the actual field time was altered to 60000/1001 of a second, so the actual VHS head rotation speed is accordingly 1798.2 rpm. The pre-color timings are quoted here for simplicity. The corresponding numbers here for PAL are, on the other hand, exact, as PAL's field rate is exactly 1/50 of a second.) 1798.2 rpm in NTSC machines, exactly 1500 in PAL, each complete rotation corresponding to one frame of video.

Two tape heads are mounted on the cylindrical surface of the drum, 180 degrees apart from each other, so that the two heads "take turns" in recording. The rotation of the inclined head drum, combined with the relatively slow movement of the tape, results in each head recording a track oriented at a diagonal with respect to the length of the tape, with the heads moving across the tape at speeds higher than what would otherwise be possible. This is referred to as helical scan recording. A tape speed of 1 5/16 inches per second corresponds to the heads on the drum moving across the tape at (a writing speed of) 4.86 or 6.096 meters per second.

To maximize the use of the tape, the video tracks are recorded very close together. To reduce crosstalk between adjacent tracks on playback, an azimuth recording method is used: The gaps of the two heads are not aligned exactly with the track path. Instead, one head is angled at plus six degrees from the track, and the other at minus six degrees. This results, during playback, in destructive interference of the signal from the tracks on either side of the one being played.

Each of the diagonal-angled tracks is a complete TV picture field, lasting 1/60 of a second (1/50 on PAL) on the display. One tape head records an entire picture field. The adjacent track, recorded by the second tape head, is another 1/60 or 1/50 of a second TV picture field, and so on. Thus one complete head rotation records an entire NTSC or PAL frame of two fields.

The original VHS specification had only two video heads. When the EP recording speed was introduced, the thickness of these heads was reduced to accommodate the narrower tracks. However, this subtly reduced the quality of the SP speed, and dramatically lowered the quality of freeze frame and high speed search. Later models implemented both wide and narrow heads, and could use all four during pause and shuttle modes to further improve quality although machines later combined both pairs into one. In machines supporting VHS HiFi (described later), yet another pair of heads was added to handle the VHS HiFi signal. Camcorders using the miniaturized drum required twice as many heads to complete any given task. This almost always meant four heads on the miniaturized drum with performance similar to a two head VCR with a full sized drum. No attempt was made to record Hi-Fi audio with such devices, as this would require an additional four heads to work. W-VHS decks could have up to 12 heads in the head drum, of which 11 were active including a flying erase head for erasing individual video fields, and one was a dummy used for balancing the head drum.

The high tape-to-head speed created by the rotating head results in a far higher bandwidth than could be practically achieved with a stationary head.

VHS machines record up to 3 MHz of baseband video bandwidth and 300 kHz of baseband chroma bandwidth. The luminance (black and white) portion of the video is frequency modulated and combined with a down-converted "color under" chroma (color) signal that is encoded using quadrature amplitude modulation. Including side bands, the signal on a VHS tape can use up to 10 MHz of RF bandwidth.

VHS horizontal resolution is 240 Television Lines or TVL, about 320 lines across a scan line. The vertical resolution (number of scan lines) is the same as the respective analog TV standard (625 or 525 lines; somewhat fewer scan lines are actually visible due to overscan and the VBI). In modern-day digital terminology, NTSC VHS resolution is roughly equivalent to ~333×480 (~159,840 pixels or ~0.16 MP) for luma and ~40×480 pixels for chroma. PAL VHS resolution is roughly ~333×576 pixels for luma and ~40×576 pixels for chroma (although when decoded PAL and SECAM half the vertical color resolution).

JVC countered 1985's SuperBeta with VHS HQ, or High Quality. The goal was to increase the apparent horizontal resolution by recording white signals at a higher level, and reduce tape background noise. The bandwidth remained unchanged to preserve compatibility with older machines.

In 1987, JVC introduced a new format called Super VHS (often known as S-VHS) which extended the bandwidth to over 5 megahertz, yielding 420 TVL (equivalent to 560 pixels left-to-right, in digital terminology). Most Super VHS recorders can play back standard VHS tapes, but not vice versa. S-VHS was designed for higher resolution, but failed to gain popularity outside Japan because of the high costs of the machines and tapes. Because of the limited user base, Super VHS was never picked up to any significant degree by manufacturers of pre-recorded tapes, although it was used extensively in the low-end professional market for filming and editing.

=== Audio recording ===
After leaving the head drum, the tape passes over the stationary audio and control head. This records a control track at the bottom edge of the tape, and one or two linear audio tracks along the top edge.

==== Original linear audio system ====
In the original VHS specification, audio was recorded as baseband in a single linear track, at the upper edge of the tape, similar to how an audio compact cassette operates. The recorded frequency range was dependent on the linear tape speed. For the VHS SP mode, which already uses a lower tape speed than the compact cassette, this resulted in a mediocre frequency response of roughly 100 Hz to 10 kHz for NTSC, frequency response for PAL VHS with its lower standard tape speed was somewhat worse of about 80 Hz to 8 kHz. The signal-to-noise ratio (SNR) was an acceptable 42 dB for NTSC and 41 dB for PAL. Both parameters degraded significantly with VHS's longer play modes, with EP/NTSC frequency response peaking at 4 kHz. S-VHS tapes can give better audio (and video) quality, because the tapes are designed to have almost twice the bandwidth of VHS at the same speed.

Sound cannot be recorded on a VHS tape without recording a video signal because the video signal is used to generate the control track pulses which effectively regulate the tape speed on playback. Even in the audio dubbing mode, a valid video recording (control track signal) must be present on the tape for audio to be correctly recorded. If there is no video signal to the VCR input during recording, most later VCRs will record black video and generate a control track while the sound is being recorded. Some early VCRs record audio without a control track signal; this is of little use, because the absence of a signal from the control track means that the linear tape speed is irregular during playback.

More sophisticated VCRs offer stereo audio recording and playback. Linear stereo fits two independent channels in the same space as the original mono audiotrack. While this approach preserves acceptable backward compatibility with monoaural audio heads, the splitting of the audio track degrades the audio's signal-to-noise ratio, causing objectionable tape hiss at normal listening volume. To counteract the hiss, linear stereo VHS VCRs use Dolby B noise reduction for recording and playback. This dynamically boosts the high frequencies of the audio program on the recorded medium, improving its signal strength relative to the tape's background noise floor, then attenuates the high frequencies during playback. Dolby-encoded program material exhibits a high-frequency emphasis when played on non-Hi-Fi VCRs that are not equipped with the matching Dolby Noise Reduction decoder, although this may actually improve the sound quality of non-Hi-Fi VCRs, especially at the slower recording speeds.

High-end consumer recorders take advantage of the linear nature of the audio track, as the audio track could be erased and recorded without disturbing the video portion of the recorded signal. Hence, "audio dubbing" and "video dubbing", where either the audio or video is re-recorded on tape (without disturbing the other), were supported features on prosumer linear video editing-decks. Without dubbing capability, an audio or video edit could not be done in-place on master cassette, and requires the editing output be captured to another tape, incurring generational loss.

Studio film releases began to emerge with linear stereo audiotracks in 1982. From that point, nearly every home video release by Hollywood featured a Dolby-encoded linear stereo audiotrack. However, linear stereo was never popular with equipment makers or consumers.

==== Tracking adjustment and index marking ====
Another linear control track at the tape's lower edge holds pulses that mark the beginning of every frame of video; these are used to fine-tune the tape speed during playback, so that the high speed rotating heads remained exactly on their helical tracks rather than somewhere between two adjacent tracks (known as "tracking"). Since good tracking depends on precise distances between the rotating drum and the fixed control/audio head reading the linear tracks, which usually varies by a couple of micrometers between machines due to manufacturing tolerances, most VCRs offer tracking adjustment, either manual or automatic, to correct such mismatches.

The control track is also used to hold index marks, which were normally written at the beginning of each recording session, and can be found using the VCR's index search function: this will fast-wind forward or backward to the nth specified index mark, and resume playback from there. At times, higher-end VCRs provided functions for the user to manually add and remove these marks.

By the late 1990s, some high-end VCRs offered more sophisticated indexing. For example, Panasonic's Tape Library system assigned an ID number to each cassette, and logged recording information (channel, date, time and optional program title entered by the user) both on the cassette and in the VCR's memory for up to 900 recordings (600 with titles).

==== Hi-Fi audio system ====
Around 1984, JVC added Hi-Fi audio to VHS (model HR-D725U, in response to Betamax's introduction of Beta Hi-Fi.) Both VHS Hi-Fi and Betamax Hi-Fi delivered flat full-range frequency response (20 Hz to 20 kHz), excellent 70 dB signal-to-noise ratio (in consumer space, second only to the compact disc), dynamic range of 90 dB, and professional audio-grade channel separation (more than 70 dB). VHS Hi-Fi audio is achieved by using audio frequency modulation (AFM), modulating the two stereo channels (L, R) on two different frequency-modulated carriers and embedding the combined modulated audio signal pair into the video signal. To avoid crosstalk and interference from the primary video carrier, VHS's implementation of AFM relied on a form of magnetic recording called depth multiplexing. The modulated audio carrier pair was placed in the hitherto-unused frequency range between the luminance and the color carrier (below 1.6 MHz), and recorded first. Subsequently, the video head erases and re-records the video signal (combined luminance and color signal) over the same tape surface, but the video signal's higher center frequency results in a shallower magnetization of the tape, allowing both the video and residual AFM audio signal to coexist on tape. (PAL versions of Beta Hi-Fi use this same technique). During playback, VHS Hi-Fi recovers the depth-recorded AFM signal by subtracting the audio head's signal (which contains the AFM signal contaminated by a weak image of the video signal) from the video head's signal (which contains only the video signal), then demodulates the left and right audio channels from their respective frequency carriers. The result of the complex process was audio of high fidelity, which was uniformly solid across all tape-speeds (EP, LP or SP.) Since JVC had gone through the complexity of ensuring Hi-Fi's backward compatibility with non-Hi-Fi VCRs, virtually all studio home video releases produced after this time contained Hi-Fi audio tracks, in addition to the linear audio track. Under normal circumstances, all Hi-Fi VHS VCRs will record Hi-Fi and linear audio simultaneously to ensure compatibility with VCRs without Hi-Fi playback, though only early high-end Hi-Fi machines provided linear stereo compatibility.

The sound quality of Hi-Fi VHS stereo is comparable to some extent to the quality of CD audio, particularly when recordings were made on high-end or professional VHS machines that have a manual audio recording level control. This high quality compared to other consumer audio recording formats such as compact cassette attracted the attention of amateur and hobbyist recording artists. Home recording enthusiasts occasionally recorded high quality stereo mixdowns and master recordings from multitrack audio tape onto consumer-level Hi-Fi VCRs. However, because the VHS Hi-Fi recording process is intertwined with the VCR's video-recording function, advanced editing functions such as audio-only or video-only dubbing are impossible. A short-lived alternative to the HiFi feature for recording mixdowns of hobbyist audio-only projects was a PCM adaptor so that high-bandwidth digital video could use a grid of black-and-white dots on an analog video carrier to give pro-grade digital sounds though DAT tapes made this obsolete.

Some VHS decks also had a "simulcast" switch, allowing users to record an external audio input along with off-air pictures. Some televised concerts offered a stereo simulcast soundtrack on FM radio and as such, events like Live Aid were recorded by thousands of people with a full stereo soundtrack despite the fact that stereo TV broadcasts were some years off (especially in regions that adopted NICAM). Other examples of this included network television shows such as Friday Night Videos and MTV for its first few years in existence. Likewise, some countries, most notably South Africa, provided alternate language audio tracks for TV programming through an FM radio simulcast.

The considerable complexity and additional hardware limited VHS Hi-Fi to high-end decks for many years. While linear stereo all but disappeared from home VHS decks, it was not until the 1990s that Hi-Fi became a more common feature on VHS decks. Even then, most customers were unaware of its significance and merely enjoyed the better audio performance of the newer decks. VHS Hi-Fi audio has been standardized in IEC 60774-2.

=== Issues with Hi-Fi audio ===
Due to the path followed by the video and Hi-Fi audio heads being striped and discontinuous—unlike that of the linear audio track—head-switching is required to provide a continuous audio signal. While the video signal can easily hide the head-switching point in the invisible vertical retrace section of the signal, so that the exact switching point is not very important, the same is obviously not possible with a continuous audio signal that has no inaudible sections. Hi-Fi audio is thus dependent on a much more exact alignment of the head switching point than is required for non-HiFi VHS machines. Misalignments may lead to imperfect joining of the signal, resulting in low-pitched buzzing. The problem is known as "head chatter", and tends to increase as the audio heads wear down.

Another issue that made VHS Hi-Fi imperfect for music is the inaccurate reproduction of levels (softer and louder) which are not re-created as the original source.

== Variations ==
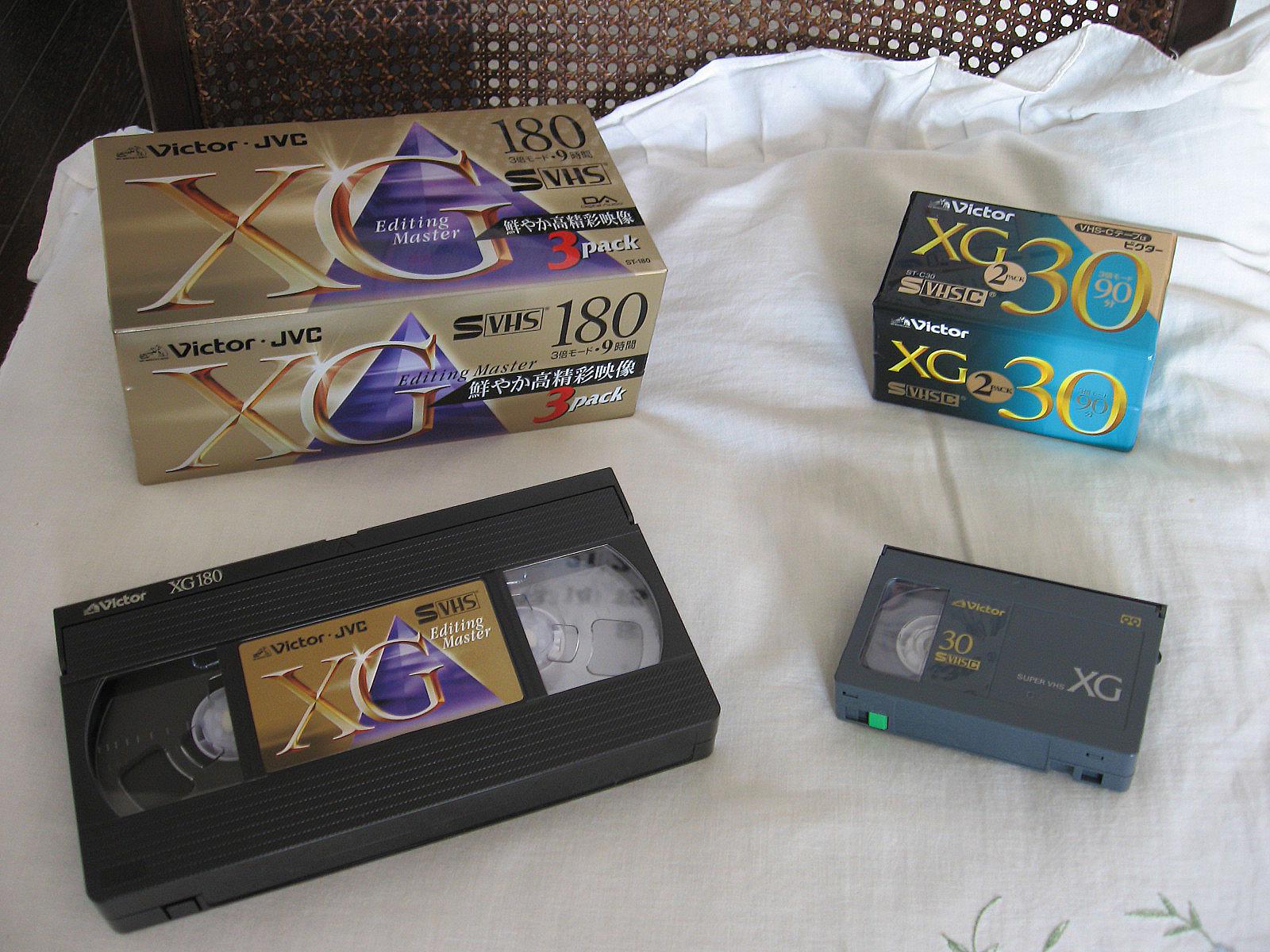
Victor S-VHS (left) and S-VHS-C (right)

=== Super-VHS / ADAT / SVHS-ET ===
Several improved versions of VHS exist, most notably Super-VHS (S-VHS), an analog video standard with improved video bandwidth. S-VHS improved the horizontal luminance resolution to 400 lines (versus 250 for VHS/Beta and 500 for DVD). The audio system (both linear and AFM) is the same. S-VHS made little impact on the home market, but gained dominance in the camcorder market due to its superior picture quality.

The ADAT format provides the ability to record multitrack digital audio using S-VHS media. JVC also developed SVHS-ET technology for its Super-VHS camcorders and VCRs, which simply allows them to record Super VHS signals onto lower-priced VHS tapes, albeit with a slight blurring of the image. Nearly all later JVC Super-VHS camcorders and VCRs have SVHS-ET ability.

=== VHS-C / Super VHS-C ===
Another variant is VHS-Compact (VHS-C), originally developed for portable VCRs in 1982, but ultimately finding success in palm-sized camcorders. The longest tape available for NTSC holds 60 minutes in SP mode and 180 minutes in EP mode. Since VHS-C tapes are based on the same magnetic tape as full-size tapes, they can be played back in standard VHS players using a mechanical adapter, without the need of any kind of signal conversion. The magnetic tape on VHS-C cassettes is wound on one main spool and uses a gear wheel to advance the tape.

The adapter is mechanical, although early examples were motorized, with a battery. It has an internal hub to engage with the VCR mechanism in the location of a normal full-size tape hub, driving the gearing on the VHS-C cassette. Also, when a VHS-C cassette is inserted into the adapter, a small swing-arm pulls the tape out of the miniature cassette to span the standard tape path distance between the guide rollers of a full-size tape. This allows the tape from the miniature cassette to use the same loading mechanism as that from the standard cassette.

Super VHS-C or S-VHS Compact was developed by JVC in 1987. S-VHS provided an improved luminance and chrominance quality, yet S-VHS recorders were compatible with VHS tapes.

Sony was unable to shrink its Betamax form any further, so instead developed Video8/Hi8 which was in direct competition with the VHS-C/S-VHS-C format throughout the 1980s, 1990s, and 2000s. Ultimately neither format "won" and both have been superseded by digital high definition equipment.

=== W-VHS / Digital-VHS (high-definition) ===
Wide-VHS (W-VHS) allowed recording of MUSE Hi-Vision analog high definition television, which was broadcast in Japan from 1989 until 2007. The other improved standard, called Digital-VHS (D-VHS), records digital high definition video onto a VHS form factor tape. D-VHS can record up to 4 hours of ATSC digital television in 720p or 1080i formats using the fastest record mode (equivalent to VHS-SP), and up to 49 hours of lower-definition video at slower speeds.

=== D9 ===
There is also a JVC-designed component digital professional production format known as Digital-S, or officially under the name D9, that uses a VHS form factor tape and essentially the same mechanical tape handling techniques as an S-VHS recorder. This format is the least expensive format to support a Sel-Sync pre-read for video editing. This format competed with Sony's Digital Betacam in the professional and broadcast market, although in that area Sony's Betacam family ruled supreme, in contrast to the outcome of the VHS/Betamax domestic format war. It has now been superseded by high definition formats.

=== V-Lite ===
In the late 1990s, there was a disposable promotional variation of the VHS format called V-Lite. It was a cassette constructed largely with polystyrene, with only the rotating components like the tape reels being of hard plastic with glued casings without standard features like a protective cover for the exposed tape. Its purpose was to be as lightweight as possible for minimized mass delivery costs for the purpose of a media company's promotional campaign and intended for only a few viewings with a runtime of typically 2 to 3 minutes. One such production so promoted was the A&E's 2000 adaptation of The Great Gatsby. The format arose concurrently and then rendered obsolete, with the rise of the DVD video format which eventually supplanted VHS, being lighter and less expensive still to mass-distribute, while video streaming would later supplant the use of physical media for video promotion altogether.

== Accessories ==
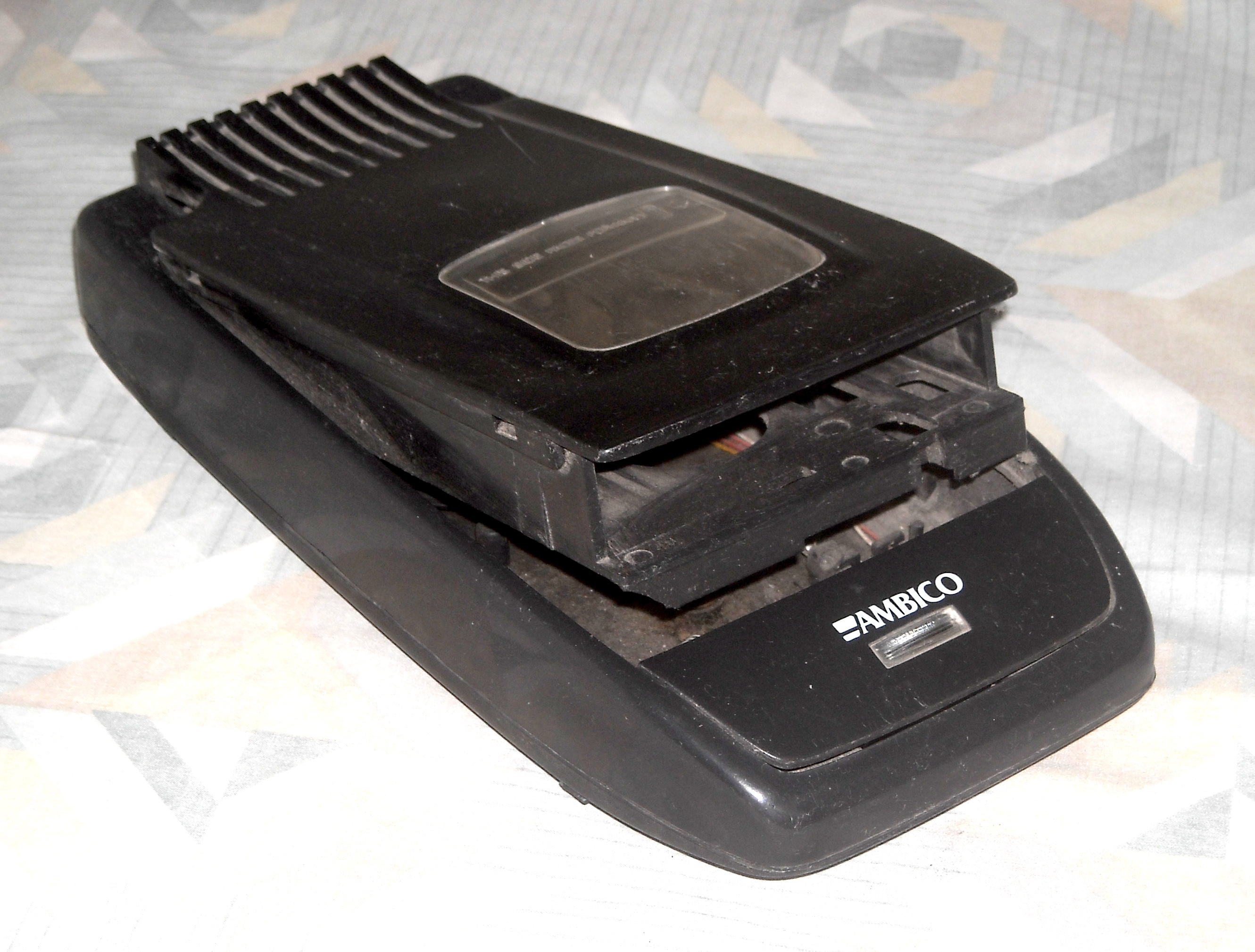
A tape rewinder

Shortly after the introduction of the VHS format, VHS tape rewinders were developed. These devices served the sole purpose of rewinding VHS tapes. Proponents of the rewinders argued that the use of the rewind function on the standard VHS player would lead to wear and tear of the transport mechanism. The rewinder would rewind the tapes smoothly and also normally do so at a faster rate than the standard rewind function on VHS players. However, some rewinder brands did have some frequent abrupt stops, which occasionally led to tape damage.

Some devices were marketed which allowed a personal computer to use a VHS recorder as a data backup device. The most notable of these was ArVid, widely used in Russia and CIS states. Similar systems were manufactured in the United States by Corvus Systems and Alpha Microsystems, and in the UK by Backer from Danmere Ltd. The Backer system could store up to 4 GB of data with a transfer rate of 9 MB per minute.

== Signal standards ==
VHS can record and play back all varieties of analog television signals in existence at the time VHS was devised. However, a machine must be designed to record a given standard. Typically, a VHS machine can only handle signals using the same standard as the country it was sold in. This is because some parameters of analog broadcast TV are not applicable to VHS recordings, the number of VHS tape recording format variations is smaller than the number of broadcast TV signal variations—for example, analog TVs and VHS machines (except multistandard devices) are not interchangeable between the UK and Germany, but VHS tapes are. The following tape recording formats exist in conventional VHS (listed in the form of standard/lines/frames):

- SECAM/625/25 (SECAM, French variety)
- MESECAM/625/25 (most other SECAM countries, notably the former Soviet Union and Middle East)
- NTSC/525/30 (Most parts of Americas, Japan, South Korea)
- PAL/525/30 (i.e., PAL-M, Brazil)
- PAL/625/25 (most of Western Europe, Australia, New Zealand, many parts of Asia such as China and India, some parts of South America such as Argentina, Uruguay and the Falklands, and Africa)

PAL/625/25 VCRs allow playback of SECAM (and MESECAM) tapes with a monochrome picture, and vice versa, as the line standard is the same. Since the 1990s, dual and multi-standard VHS machines, able to handle a variety of VHS-supported video standards, became more common. For example, VHS machines sold in Australia and Europe could typically handle PAL, MESECAM for record and playback, and NTSC for playback only on suitable TVs. Dedicated multi-standard machines can usually handle all standards listed, and some high-end models could convert the content of a tape from one standard to another on the fly during playback by using a built-in standards converter.

S-VHS is only implemented as such in PAL/625/25 and NTSC/525/30; S-VHS machines sold in SECAM markets record internally in PAL, and convert between PAL and SECAM during recording and playback. S-VHS machines for the Brazilian market record in NTSC and convert between it and PAL-M.

A small number of VHS decks are able to decode closed captions on video cassettes before sending the full signal to the set with the captions. A smaller number still are able, additionally, to record subtitles transmitted with world standard teletext signals (on pre-digital services), simultaneously with the associated program. S-VHS has a sufficient resolution to record teletext signals with relatively few errors, although for some years now it has been possible to recover teletext pages and even complete "page carousels" from regular VHS recordings using non-real-time computer processing.

== Uses in marketing ==
VHS was popular for long-form content, such as feature films or documentaries, as well as short-play content, such as music videos, in-store videos, teaching videos, distribution of lectures and talks, and demonstrations. VHS instruction tapes were sometimes included with various products and services, including exercise equipment, kitchen appliances, and computer software. The aforementioned V-Lite format was designed specifically for this purpose for minimizing distribution costs.

== Comparison to Betamax ==
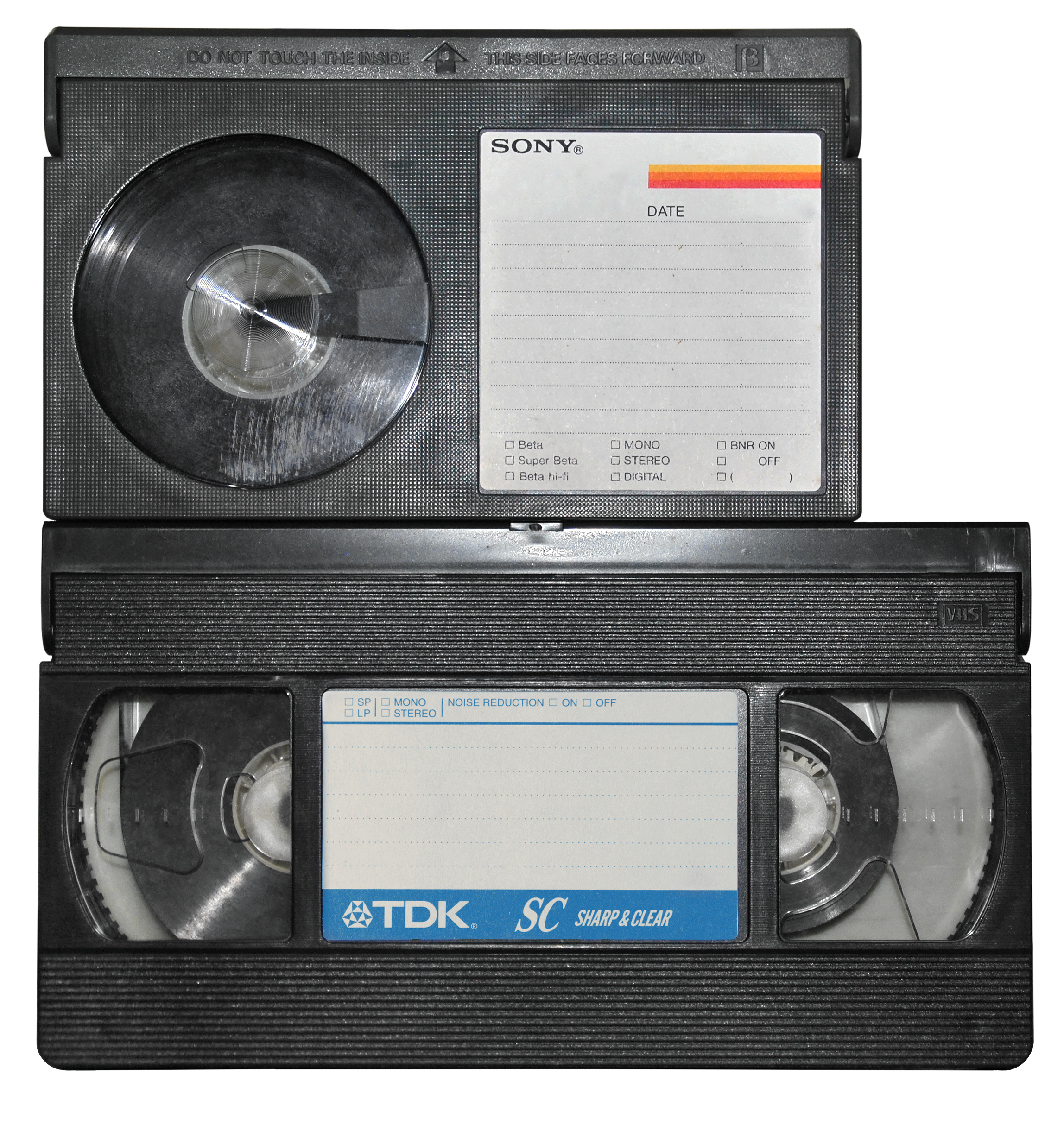
Size comparison between Betamax (top) and VHS (bottom) videocassettes

VHS was the winner of a protracted and somewhat bitter format war during the late 1970s and early 1980s against Sony's Betamax format as well as other formats of the time.

Betamax was widely perceived at the time as the better format, as the cassette was smaller in size, and Betamax offered slightly better video quality than VHS – it had lower video noise, less luma-chroma crosstalk, and was marketed as providing pictures superior to those of VHS. However, the sticking point for both consumers and potential licensing partners of Betamax was the total recording time. To overcome the recording limitation, Beta II speed (two-hour mode, NTSC regions only) was released in order to compete with VHS's two-hour SP mode, thereby reducing Betamax's horizontal resolution to 240 lines (vs 250 lines). In turn, the extension of VHS to VHS HQ produced 250 lines (vs 240 lines), so that overall a typical Betamax/VHS user could expect virtually identical resolution. (Very high-end Betamax machines still supported recording in the Beta I mode and some in an even higher resolution Beta Is (Beta I Super HiBand) mode, but at a maximum single-cassette run time of 1:40 [with an L-830 cassette].)

Because Betamax was released more than a year before VHS, it held an early lead in the format war. However, by 1981, United States' Betamax sales had dipped to only 25-percent of all sales. There was debate between experts over the cause of Betamax's loss. Some, including Sony's founder Akio Morita, say that it was due to Sony's licensing strategy with other manufacturers, which consistently kept the overall cost for a unit higher than a VHS unit, and that JVC allowed other manufacturers to produce VHS units license-free, thereby keeping costs lower. Others say that VHS had better marketing, since the much larger electronics companies at the time (Matsushita, for example) supported VHS. Sony would make its first VHS players/recorders in 1988, although it continued to produce Betamax machines concurrently until 2002.

== Decline ==
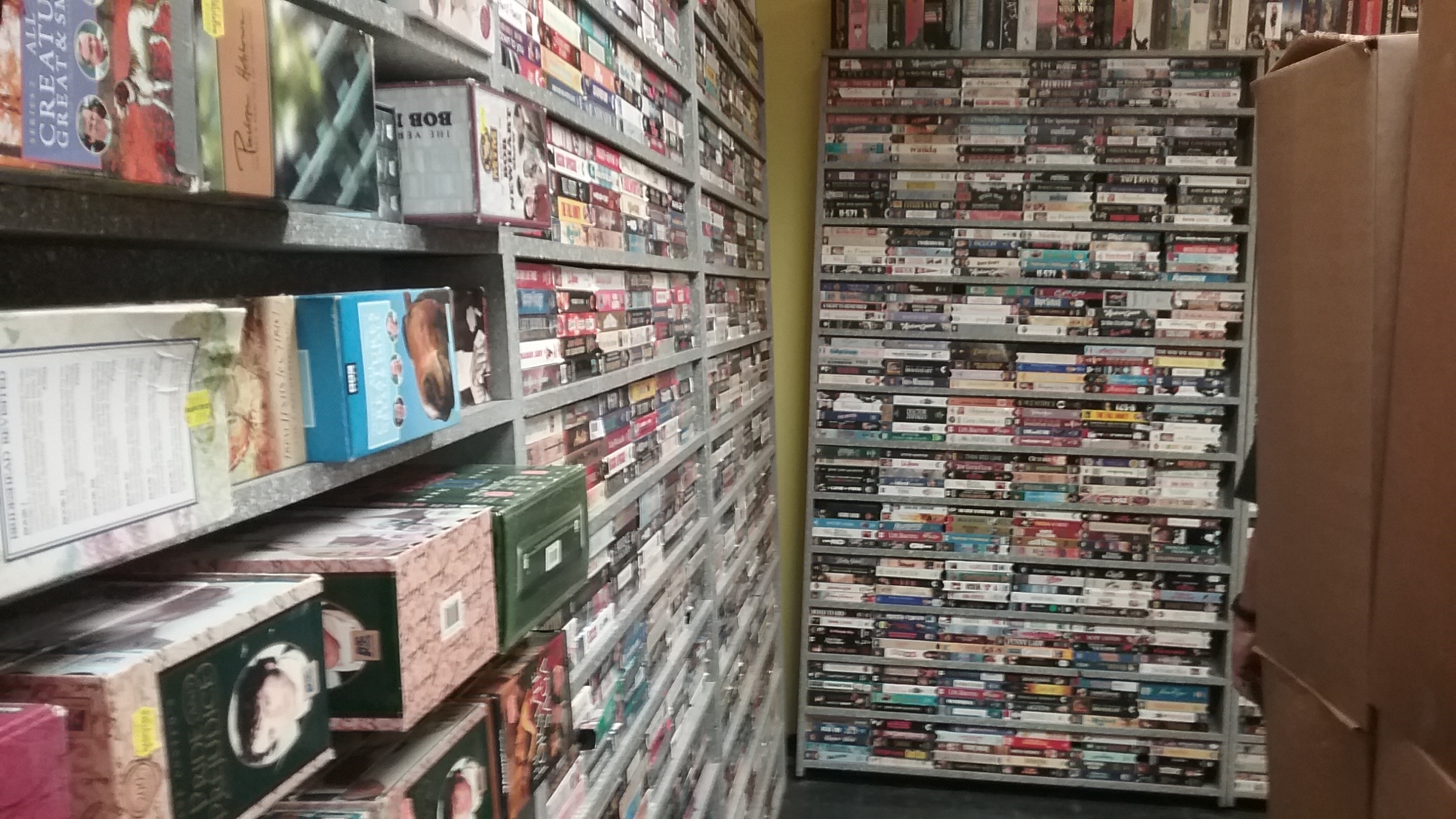
A Rasputin Music retailer (Fresno, California) selling used VHS cassettes from 50¢ to $1.98 each (2019)

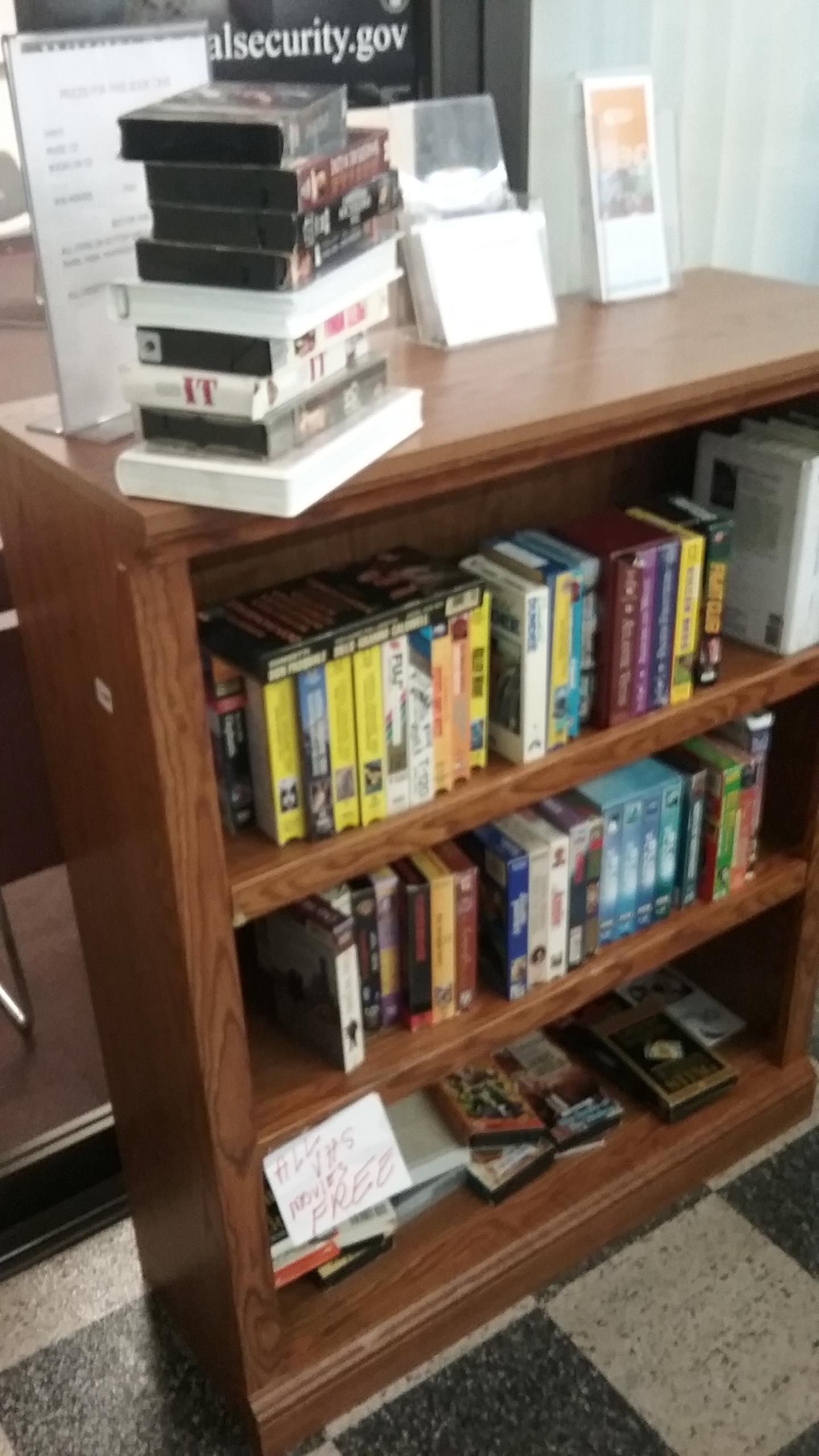
Fig Garden Regional Library, a branch of Fresno County Public Library, giving away their weeded VHS collections for free, 2019

VHS was widely used in television-equipped American and European living rooms for more than twenty years from its introduction in the late 1970s. The home television recording market, also known as the VHS market, as well as the camcorder market, has since transitioned to digital recording on solid-state memory cards. The introduction of the DVD format to American consumers in March 1997 triggered the market share decline of VHS.

DVD rentals surpassed those on the VHS format in the United States for the first time in June 2003. The Hill said that David Cronenberg's movie A History of Violence, sold on VHS in 2006, was "widely believed to be the last instance of a major motion picture to be released in that format". By December 2008, the Los Angeles Times reported on "the final truckload of VHS tapes" being shipped from a warehouse in Palm Harbor, Florida, citing Ryan J. Kugler's Distribution Video Audio Inc. as "the last major supplier".

Though 94.5 million Americans still owned VHS format VCRs in 2005, market share continued to drop. In the mid-2000s, several retail chains in the United States and Europe announced they would stop selling VHS equipment. In the U.S., no major brick-and-mortar retailers stock VHS home-video releases, focusing only on DVD and Blu-ray media. Sony Pictures Home Entertainment along with other companies ceased production of VHS in late 2010 in South Korea.

The last known company in the world to manufacture VHS equipment was Funai of Japan, who produced videocassette recorders under the Sanyo brand in North America. Funai ceased production of VHS equipment (VCR/DVD combos) in July 2016, citing falling sales and a shortage of components.

== Modern use ==
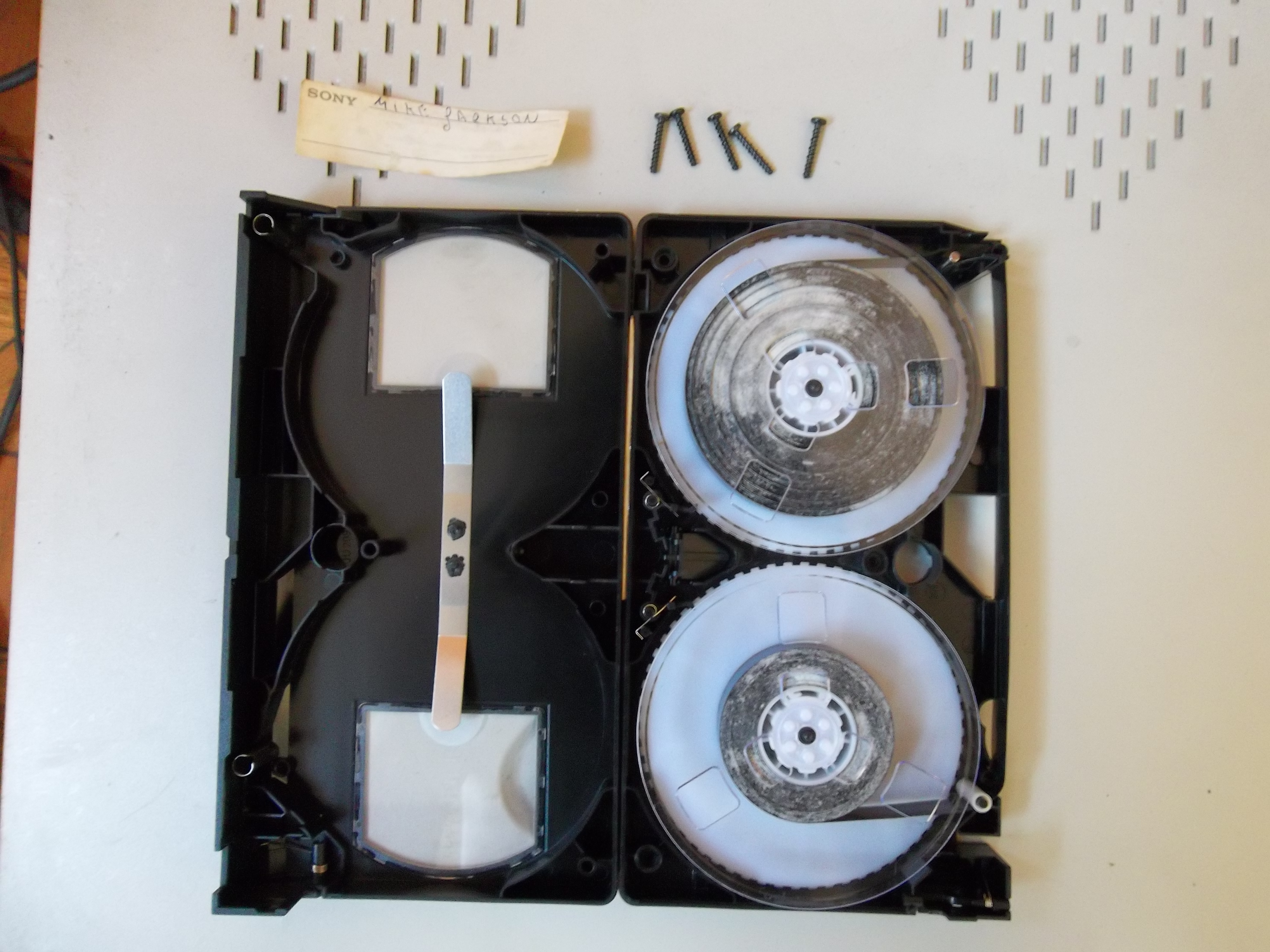
A badly molded VHS tape. Mold can prevent modern use. See media preservation

Despite the decline in both VHS players and programming on VHS machines, they are still owned in some households worldwide. Those who still use or hold on to VHS do so for a number of reasons, including nostalgic value, ease of use in recording, keeping personal videos or home movies, watching content currently exclusive to VHS, and collecting. Some expatriate communities in the United States also obtain video content from their native countries in VHS format.

Although VHS has been discontinued in the United States, VHS recorders and blank tapes were still sold at stores in other developed countries prior to digital television transitions. As an acknowledgement of the continued use of VHS, Panasonic announced the world's first dual deck VHS-Blu-ray player in 2009. The last standalone JVC VHS-only unit was produced October 28, 2008. JVC, and other manufacturers, continued to make combination DVD+VHS units even after the decline of VHS. Countries like South Korea released American films on VHS until December 2010 as well as South Korean films until February 2011, with Inception being the last Hollywood film to be released on VHS in the country, as well as Detective Dee and the Mystery of the Phantom Flame and Haunters being the very last non-Hollywood films being released on VHS over there.

A market for pre-recorded VHS tapes has continued, and some online retailers such as Amazon still sell new and used pre-recorded VHS cassettes of movies and television programs. None of the major Hollywood studios generally issues releases on VHS. The last major studio film to be released in the format in the United States and Canada, other than as part of special marketing promotions, was A History of Violence in 2006. In October 2008, Distribution Video Audio Inc., the last major American supplier of pre-recorded VHS tapes, shipped its final truckload of tapes to stores in America.

However, there have been a few exceptions. For example, The House of the Devil was released on VHS in 2010 as an Amazon-exclusive deal, in keeping with the film's intent to mimic 1980s horror films. The first Paranormal Activity film, produced in 2007, had a VHS release in the Netherlands in 2010. The horror film V/H/S/2 was released as a combo in North America that included a VHS tape in addition to a Blu-ray and a DVD copy on September 24, 2013. In 2019, Paramount Pictures produced limited quantities of the 2018 film Bumblebee to give away as promotional contest prizes. In 2021, professional wrestling promotion Impact Wrestling released a limited run of VHS tapes containing that year's Slammiversary, which quickly sold out. The company later announced future VHS runs of pay-per-view events.

The VHS medium has a cult following. For instance, in February 2021, it was reported that VHS was once again doing well as an underground market. In January 2023, it was reported that VHS tapes were once again becoming valuable collector's items. VHS collecting would make a comeback in the 2020s. The 2024 horror film, Alien: Romulus, had a limited release on VHS, marking the first major Hollywood film to receive an official VHS release since 2007. In November 2025, Lionsgate Films reissued VHS releases of the films Leprechaun (1993), American Psycho (2000), Cabin Fever (2002), Scream 4 (2011) in June 2026, Kill Bill: Volume 1 (2003) in July 2026. In April 2026, This Is How The World Ends became the first straight-to-VHS release in 20 years.

== Successors ==
=== VCD ===
The Video CD (VCD) was created in 1993, becoming an alternative medium for video, in a CD-sized disc. Though occasionally showing compression artifacts and color banding that are common discrepancies in digital media, the durability and longevity of a VCD depends on the production quality of the disc, and its handling. The data stored digitally on a VCD theoretically does not degrade (in the analog sense like tape). In the disc player, there is no physical contact made with either the data or label sides. When handled properly, a VCD will last a long time.

Since a VCD can hold only 74 minutes of video, a movie exceeding that mark has to be divided into two or more discs.

=== DVD ===
The DVD-Video format was introduced first on November 1, 1996, in Japan; to the United States on March 26, 1997 (test marketed); and mid-to-late 1998 in Europe and Australia.

While the DVD was highly successful in the pre-recorded retail market, it failed to displace VHS for in home recording of video content (e.g. broadcast or cable television). A number of factors hindered the commercial success of the DVD in this regard, including:

- A reputation for being temperamental and unreliable, as well as the risk of scratches and hairline cracks.
- Incompatibilities in playing discs recorded on a different manufacturer's machines to that of the original recording machine.
- Compression artifacts. MPEG-2 video compression can result in visible artifacts such as macroblocking, mosquito noise and ringing which become accentuated in extended recording modes (more than three hours on a DVD-5 disc). Standard VHS will not suffer from any of these problems, all of which are characteristic of certain digital video compression systems, but VHS will result in reduced luminance and chroma resolution, which makes the picture look horizontally blurred (resolution decreases further with LP and EP recording modes). VHS also adds considerable noise to both the luminance and chroma channels.

=== High-capacity digital recording technologies ===
High-capacity digital recording systems are also gaining in popularity with home users. These types of systems come in several form factors:

- Hard disk drive–based set-top boxes
- Hard disk/optical disc combination set-top boxes
- Personal computer–based media center
- Portable media players with TV-out capability

Hard disk-based systems include TiVo as well as other digital video recorder (DVR) offerings. These types of systems provide users with a no-maintenance solution for capturing video content. Customers of subscriber-based TV generally receive electronic program guides, enabling one-touch setup of a recording schedule. Hard disk–based systems allow for many hours of recording without user-maintenance. For example, a 120 GB system recording at an extended recording rate (XP) of 10 Mbit/s MPEG-2 can record over 25 hours of video content.

== Legacy ==
VHS is considered an important medium of visual history. Its influence on art and cinema was highlighted in a retrospective staged at the Museum of Arts and Design in 2013. In 2015, the Yale University Library collected nearly 3,000 horror and exploitation movies on VHS tapes, distributed from 1978 to 1985, calling them "the cultural id of an era."

The documentary film Rewind This! (2013), directed by Josh Johnson, tracks the impact of VHS on film industry through various filmmakers and collectors.

The Last Blockbuster is still renting out VHS tapes, and is based in Bend, Oregon, a town home to under 100,000 people as of 2020.

The VHS aesthetic is also a central component of the analog horror genre, which is largely known for imitating recordings of late 20th century TV broadcasts.

In 2023, a VHS tape of Nukie (1987) was sold on eBay for $80,600 by Red Letter Media, becoming the most expensive VHS tape ever sold. Red Letter Media had been sent a large number of tapes of the film over the years by fans, and after getting one tape professionally graded, they then destroyed all of the remaining copies except one to artificially inflate the value as an experiment and commentary on collector culture. All profits were donated to St Jude's Children Research Hospital and the Wisconsin Humane Society.

== See also ==
- Analog video
- ArVid
- Tape head cleaner
- Analog video on discs:
  - Capacitance Electronic Disc (CED)
  - Video High Density (VHD)
  - LaserDisc
