= JVC GR-C1 =

Pioneering VHS camcorder from 1984

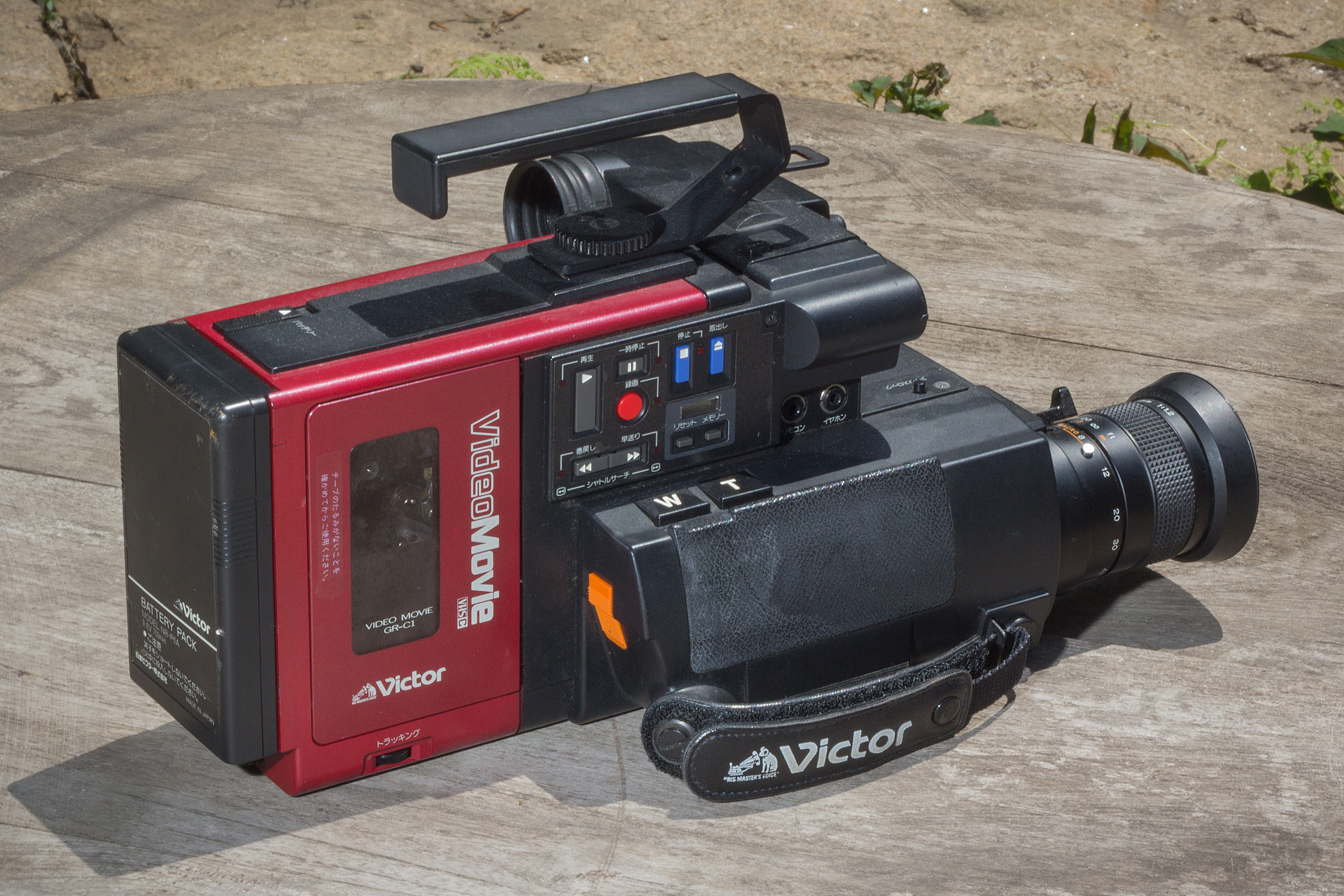
GR-C1 camcorder. This Japanese-labelled model features the "Victor" brand (as used in the company's home market), rather than the "JVC" name used outside Japan.

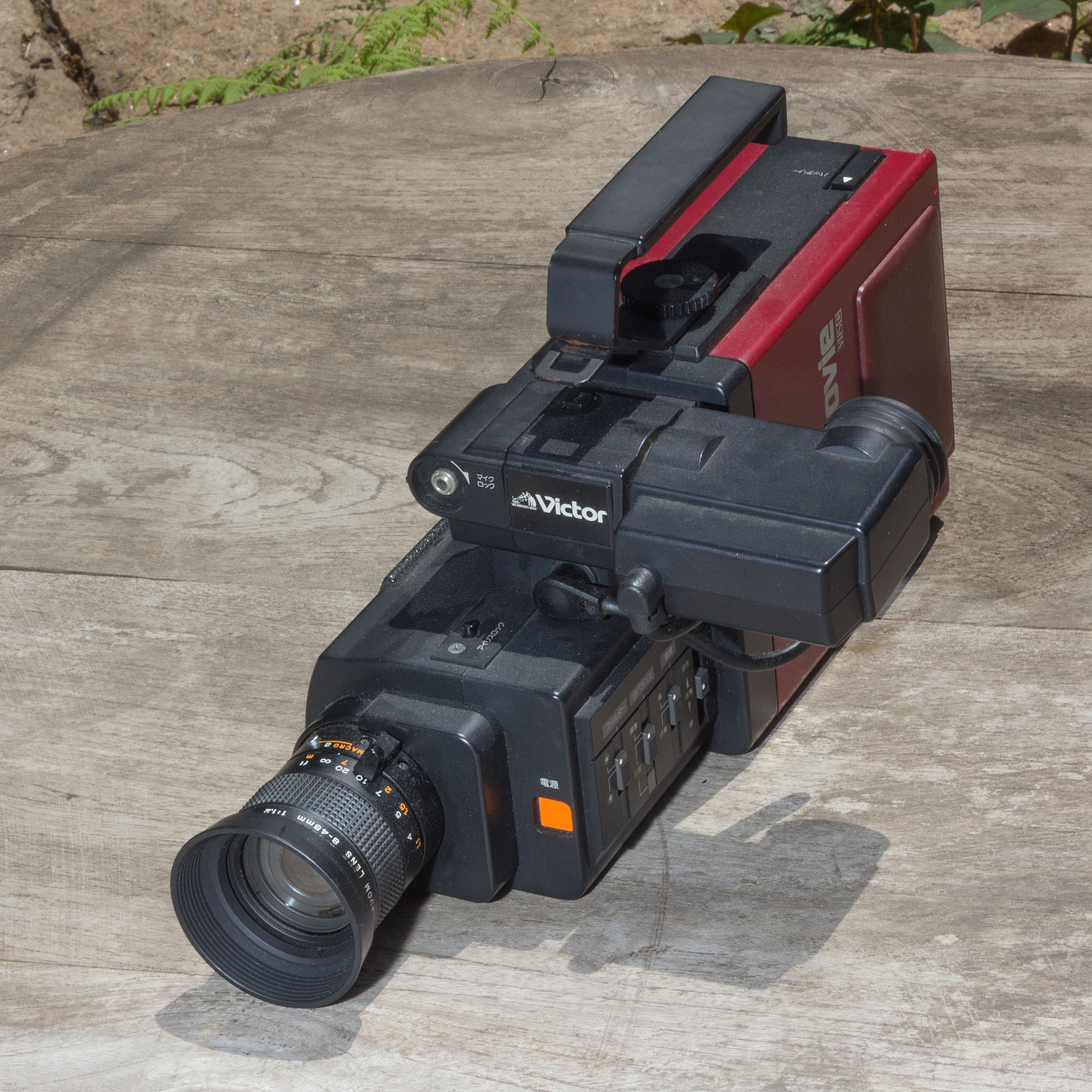
Front view of the Victor GR-C1 camcorder

The JVC GR-C1 VideoMovie was a camcorder released in March 1984 by JVC. It was notable as the second consumer-grade all-in-one camcorder after 1983 Sony Betamovie, as opposed to earlier portable systems in which the camera and recorder were separate units linked by a cable (portapaks), and as the first VHS-C camcorder.

The camera section was built around a 1/2" Saticon pickup tube, while the recorder used a 20-minute VHS-C video cassette, which could be played back in a standard VHS VCR using an adapter. The camera was also capable of playback in the viewfinder or through a composite video cable. A separate RF modulator was available to enable connection to the aerial socket of domestic televisions.

The GR-C1 was voted one of the top 100 gadgets of all time.

Unlike the GR-C1, the Sony Betamovie could record but not play back. In 1985 Sony released three CCD-based 8-mm camcorders and stopped using Beta cassettes for consumer-grade camcorders.

== Rebranded versions ==
It was also released under license and in a black finish by the German company Telefunken as the 890 Movie and in a dark red by the German company SABA as the VM 6700. Below is a list of rebranded versions.

- Ferguson Videostar 3V41
- ITT VMC 3865
- Nordmende CV 155
- Saba VM6700
- Telefunken 890 Movie
- Zenith VM6000

== In popular culture ==
The JVC GR-C1 was famous as Doc Brown's video camera (operated by Marty McFly) in the film Back to the Future.

It also featured in Stranger Things season 2 (set in 1984), as the camcorder Bob Newby hands over to Jonathan Byers to use when he takes Will and the other kids trick-or-treating and is used to record the Mind Flayer.

The JVC GR-C1 was the subject of an episode of Marques Brownlee's YouTube Originals series 'Retro Tech'.

It is shown in S7E13 of The Goldbergs titled: "Geoff the Pleaser". The "other" Adam Goldberg places it on the display towards the end of the episode.

The 2024 film MaXXXine featured a JVC GR-C1 in one scene where Kevin Bacon's role John Labat follows Mia Goth's Maxine Minx at the studio parking lot and filming her, disturbed and angered by what he did, she confront him by throwing a camera which completely destroys it and punch him in self-defense with a makeshift brass knuckle made out of her house keys.
