= Videosphere =

Japanese CRT television brand

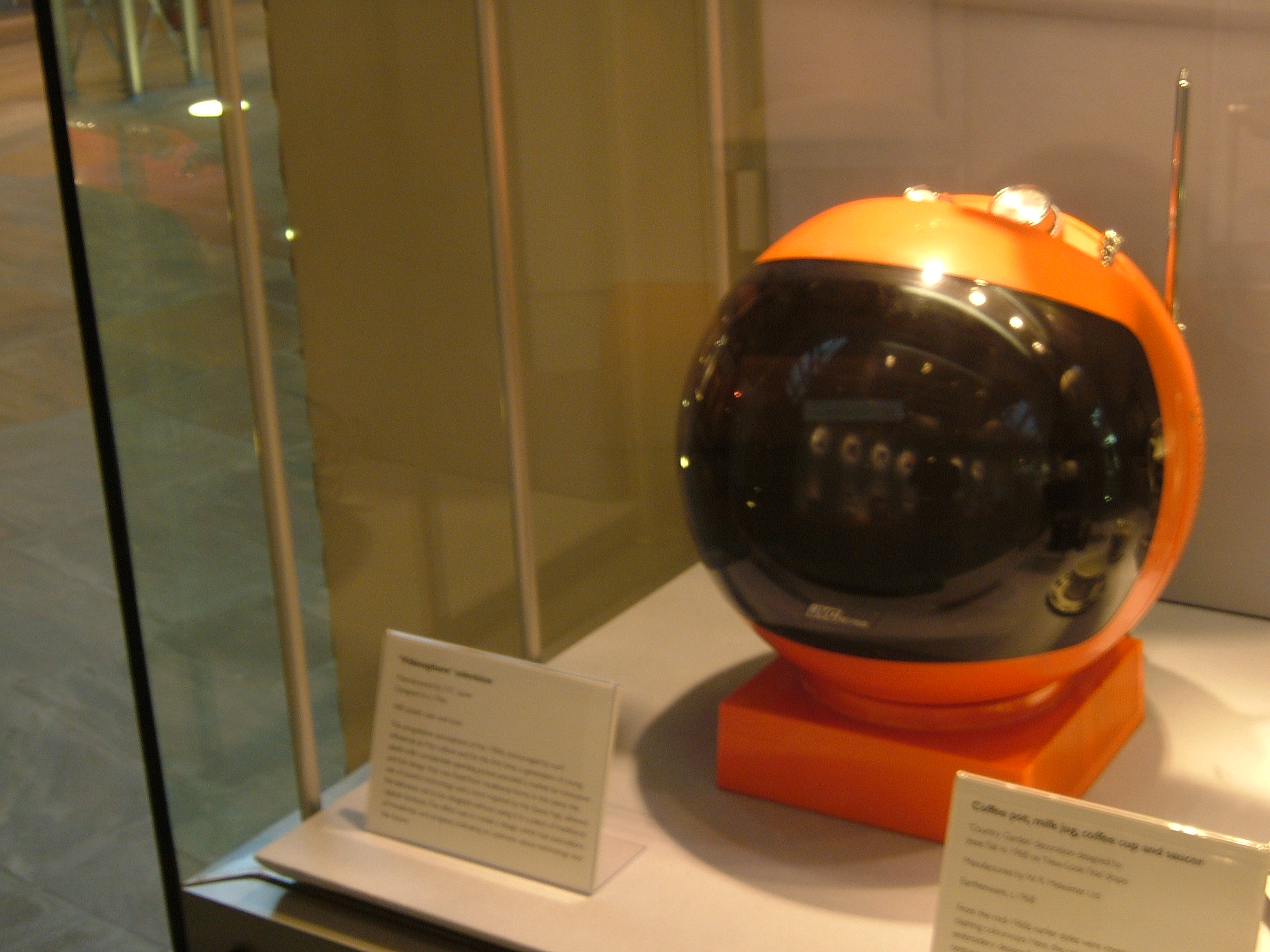
JVC Videosphere displayed at the Geffrye Museum.

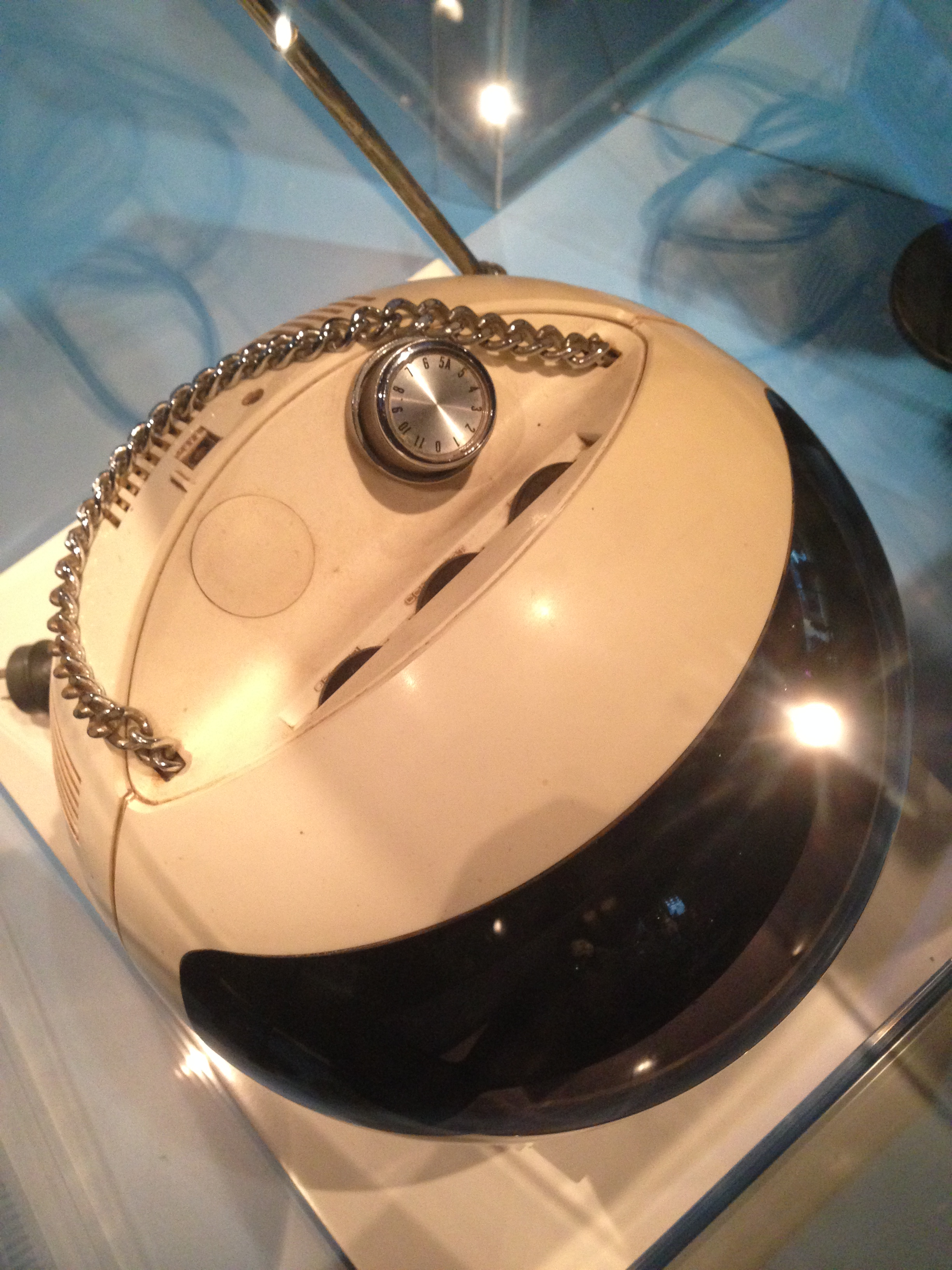
Top of the Videosphere showing the chain handle and channel dial.

The Videosphere is a JVC CRT television that was shaped in the form of a space helmet. It was first introduced in 1970 and was sold up until the early 1980s. It was popular for its modern design; the alarm clock base was an option, most units have a plain base.

Videospheres were produced in large quantities in white, red, black, orange and grey. Videospheres may come in a variety of different colors, but their screen remains in a simple black and white, with dials to adjust volume, brightness, and contrast. To operate the television, there is a main dial at the top of the sphere for channel selection. Color televisions were being produced at this time, but they were costly. Therefore, the Videosphere screen most likely did not come in color because making a television that small would have been too expensive. The television screen is a rectangular shape, despite being encased in a circular shell. The Videosphere also has a chain handle on its top, allowing it to come off its stand and be hung from a wall or ceiling to be seen from anywhere in a room. One reason the television was so innovative was that it was designed to be portable. All Videospheres came with a battery pack that is rechargeable and allows it to be played outside of a traditional home setting. Videospheres could also be powered from a vehicle's cigarette lighter.

The design of the Videosphere is said to have been inspired by the film 2001: A Space Odyssey, though its shape in itself remains as one of the most iconic examples of the early 1970s design ethos. The Videosphere was also said to be influenced by the Moon landing in 1969. After this took place, American culture shifted greatly to all things space themed. The sci-fi look of the TV saw a red model appear as a background prop in the 1999 film The Matrix, though they have appeared in sci-fi films since the early 70s. Soylent Green had a red model on screen as a prop. In the 1972 film Conquest of the Planet of the Apes, a black Videosphere was shown with a color-capable tube and a slot that allowed a cassette tape capable of playing video. Humorously, the color image on the Videosphere goes from being rectangular in one scene to round in another scene.

== Later history ==
Today, Videospheres can still be purchased, although they stopped being manufactured in the early 1980s. They are tricky to find, and sell for a price of about US$1000. While finding one may be a challenge, getting it up and running is also not an easy task, as parts to fix and replace on it are scarce. With spare parts becoming an issue for restorers of Videospheres, it is not uncommon to see spare parts sold on online auctions. Replacement visor screens are particularly sought after. If one is found in operating condition, Videospheres can still be used. While operating a Videosphere is still possible because interfaces such as HDMI were not invented when they were at the height of their usage, a converter box that gives the desired inputs would also need to be purchased.

Video artist Nam June Paik used a white videosphere for his installation TV Buddha in 1974.
