= JVC =

Japanese electronics brand

Victor Company of Japan, Limited

- Former headquarters building
- Trade name: Victor; JVC
- Native name: 日本ビクター株式会社
- Romanized name: Nihon Bikutā kabushiki gaisha
- Type: Subsidiary
- Traded as: TYO: 6792; OSE: 6792 (1960–2008)
- Industry: Electronics
- Founded: September 13, 1927; 99 years ago
- Defunct: October 1, 2011; 15 years ago (Note: The original company was absorbed into JVCKenwood, although some products made by the company still use the JVC brand.)
- Fate: Absorbed into JVCKenwood Corporation
- Successor: JVCKenwood Corporation
- Headquarters: Moriya-cho, Yokohama, Kanagawa Prefecture, Japan
- Products: Audio, visual, computer-related electronics and software, media products
- Revenue: ▼¥658.4 billion (Fiscal year ended March 31, 2008)
- Owner: Victor Talking Machine Company (1927–1929); Radio Corporation of America (1929–1942); Matsushita Electric (majority stake, 1954–2008); JVCKenwood (2008–present)
- Number of employees: 19,044 (consolidated, as of 31 March 2008)
- Website: jvc.net

The Victor Company of Japan, Limited (日本ビクター株式会社, Nihon Bikutā kabushiki gaisha), abbreviated and branded as JVC, was a Japanese electronics company. While defunct as an independent entity as of 2008, it survives as a brand owned and operated by its successor JVCKenwood. The company is best known for having introduced Japan's first televisions (in 1939), for developing the Video Home System (VHS) analog video format, and for its pioneering camcorder JVC GR-C1 (in 1984).

JVC was founded in 1927 as the Victor Talking Machine Company of Japan. It sold its electronic products in its home market of Japan under the "Victor" name with the His Master's Voice logo. However, the company used the name JVC or Nivico in the past for export; this was due to differing ownership of the His Master's Voice logo and the ownership of the "Victor" name from successors of the Victor Talking Machine Company.

From 1954 to 2008, the Matsushita Electric Industrial Co. (now known as Panasonic) was the majority stockholder in JVC. In 2008, JVC merged with Kenwood Corporation to create JVCKenwood, with JVC becoming a subsidiary of the new entity. In 2011, the Victor brand for electronics in Japan was replaced by the global JVC brand and the JVC subsidiary dissolved and integrated into a single JVCKenwood company. However, the previous "Victor" name is retained by JVCKenwood subsidiary Victor Entertainment.

== History ==
=== 1927 creation to World War II ===
JVC was founded in 1927 as the Victor Talking Machine Company of Japan, Limited, a subsidiary of the United States' leading phonograph and record company, the Victor Talking Machine Company of Camden, New Jersey. In 1929, the Radio Corporation of America purchased Victor and its foreign subsidiaries, including the Japan operations. In the late 1920s, JVC produced only phonographs and records; following the acquisition by RCA, JVC began producing radios, and in 1939, Japan's first locally made television. In 1943, amidst the hostilities between the United States and Japan during World War II, JVC seceded from RCA Victor, retaining the 'Victor' and "His Master's Voice" trademarks for use in Japan only. After the war, JVC resumed distribution of RCA Victor recordings in Japan until RCA established its separate distribution in Japan during the late 1960s. Today, the record company in Japan is known as Victor Entertainment.

=== Post-war ===
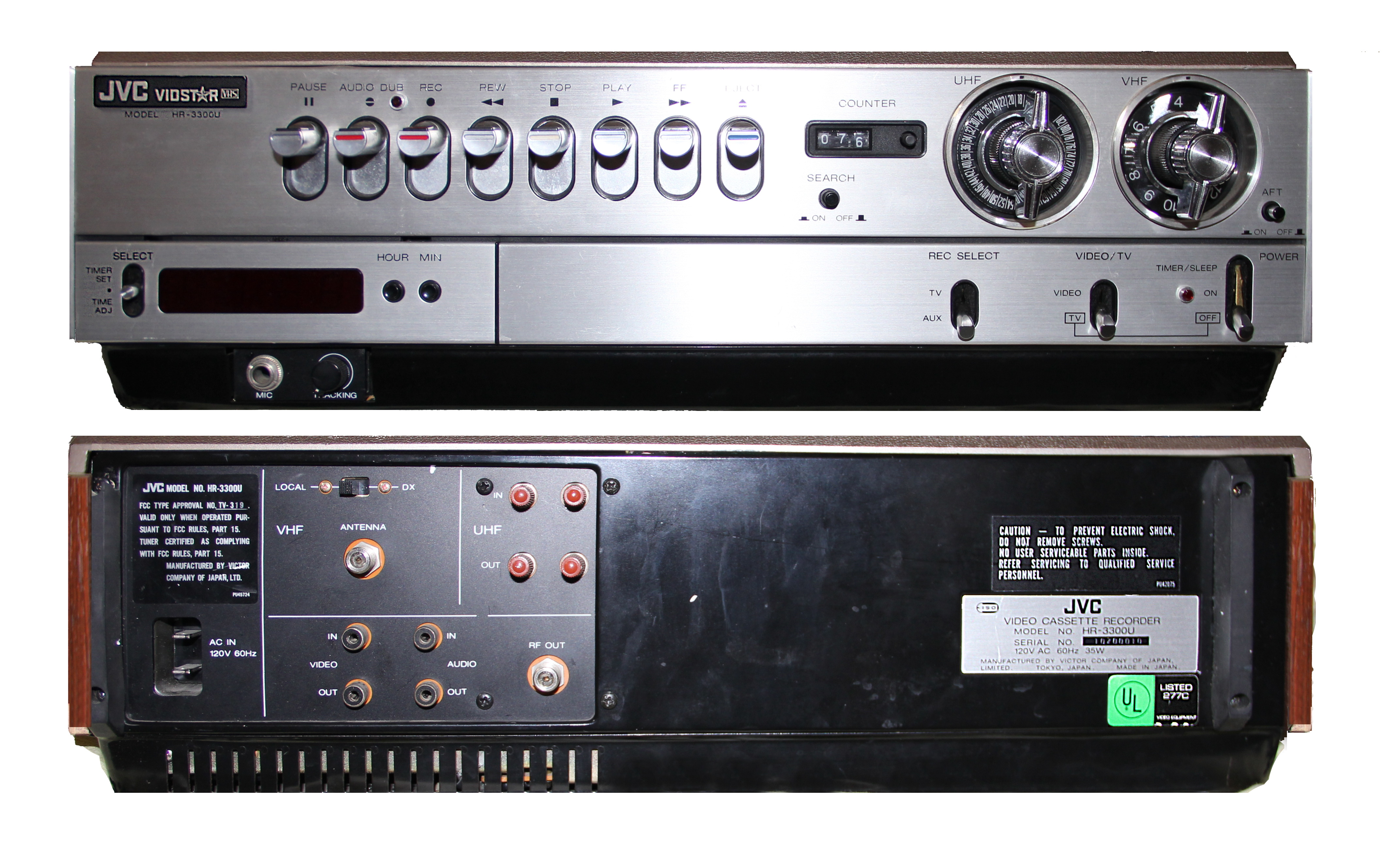
JVC HR-3300U VIDSTAR (1977)

In 1953, JVC became majority-owned by the Matsushita Corporation. Matsushita released its ownership in 2007.

In the 1960s, JVC established the Nivico (Nippon Victor Corporation) brand for Delmonico's line of console televisions and stereos.

In 1970, JVC marketed the Videosphere, a portable cathode-ray tube (CRT) television inside a space-helmet-shaped casing with an alarm clock at the base. It was a commercial success.

In 1971, JVC introduced the first discrete system for four channel quadraphonic sound on vinyl records - CD-4 (Compatible Discrete Four Channel) or Quadradisc, as it was called by the Radio Corporation of America (RCA) in the United States.

In 1973, the JVC Cutting Center opened (in the USA) to provide mastering for CD-4 discs. The Mark II 1/2 speed system was used until mid-1975 when it was replaced with the Mark III 1/2 speed system. In 1978, Mobile Fidelity began using the JVC Cutting Center to 1/2 speed master Stereo/Mono discs.

In 1975, JVC introduced the first combined portable battery-operated radio with inbuilt TV, as the model 3050. The TV was a 3-inch (7.6 cm) black-and-white CRT. One year later, JVC expanded the model to add a cassette recorder, as the 3060, creating the world's first boombox with radio, cassette and TV.

In 1976, the first VCR to use VHS was the Victor HR-3300, and was introduced by the president of JVC at the Okura Hotel in Tokyo on September 9, 1976. JVC started selling the HR-3300 in Akihabara, Tokyo, Japan on October 31, 1976. Region-specific versions of the JVC HR-3300 were also distributed later on, such as the HR-3300U in the United States, and HR-3300EK in the United Kingdom.

=== 1970s, 1980s and the VHS/Betamax format war ===
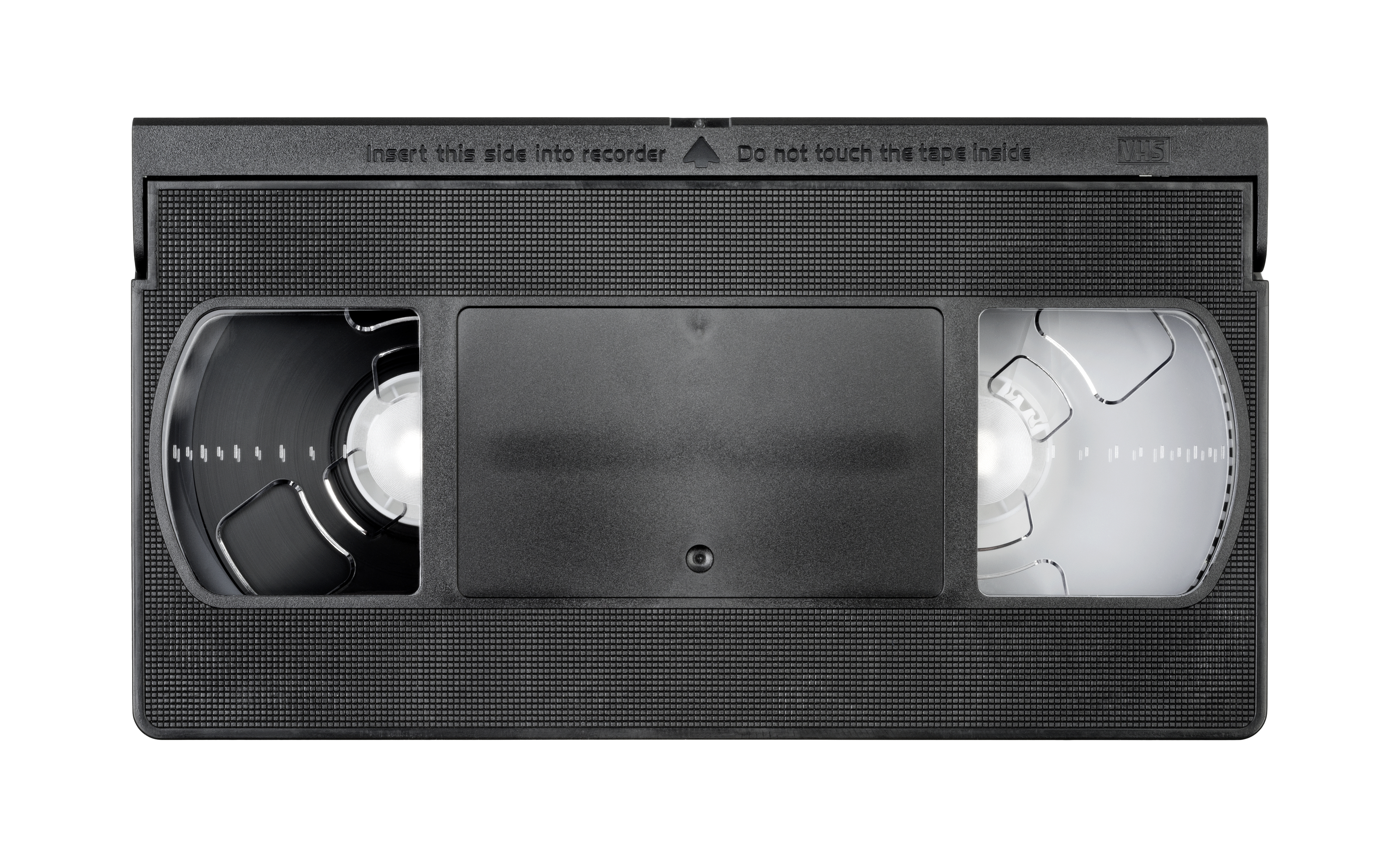
JVC's VHS tape won over Betamax to become common home recording format.

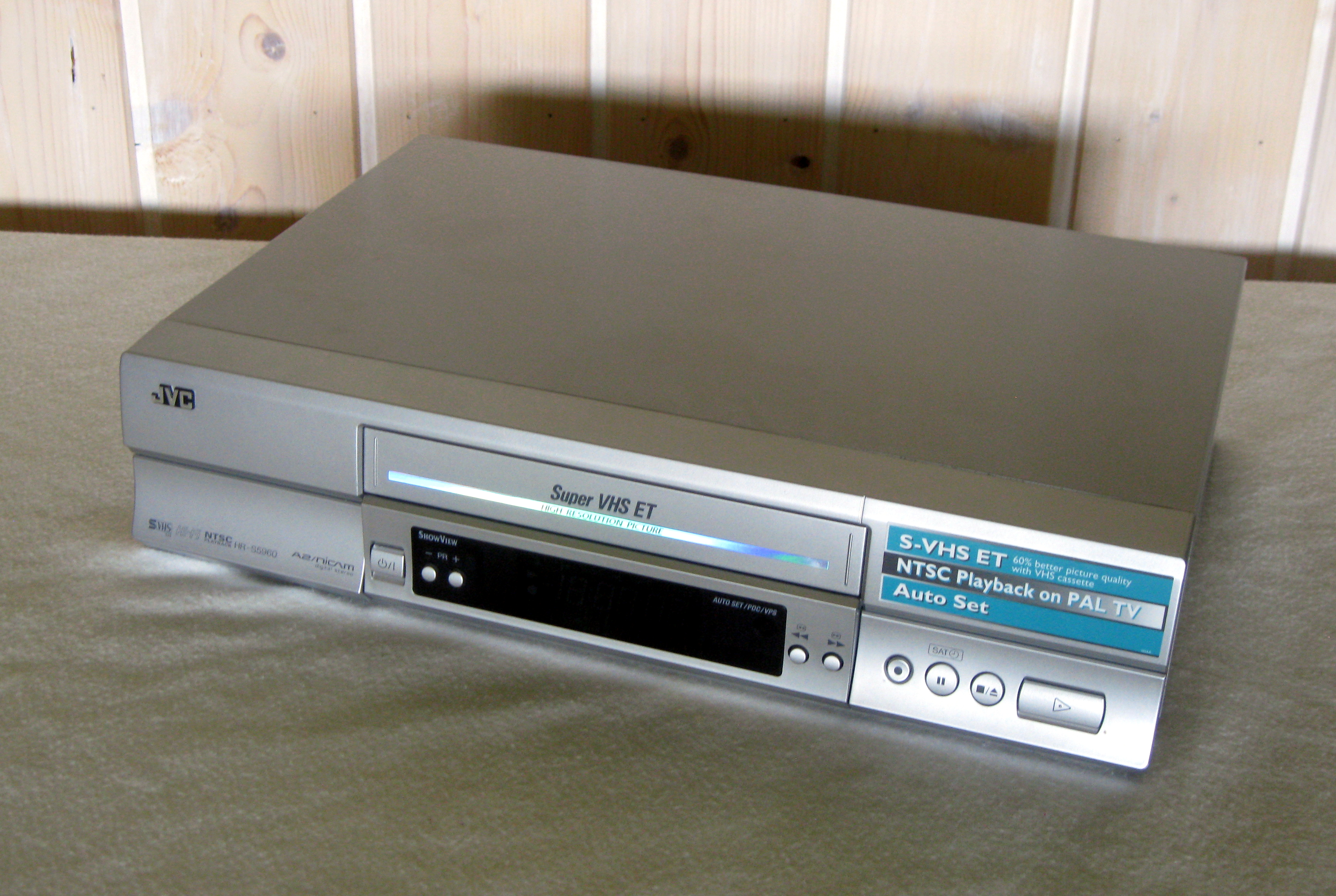
JVC HR-S5960E, S-VHS-Videorecorder

In the late 1970s, JVC developed the VHS format, introducing the first VHS recorders to the consumer market in 1976 for the equivalent of US$1,060. Sony, which had introduced the Betamax home videocassette tape a year earlier, became the main competitor for JVC's VHS format into the 1980s, creating the videotape format war. The Betamax cassette was smaller, with slightly superior picture quality to the VHS cassette, but this resulted in Betamax having less recording time. The two companies competed strongly to encourage others to adopt their format, but by 1984 forty companies were using JVC's VHS format, while only 12 used Betamax. Sony began producing VHS recorders in 1988. However, Sony stopped making Betamax recorders for the US market in 1993; they stopped production of the format completely in 2002. One reason for the market penetration of VHS in the UK were the sales of blank tapes by JVC UK Ltd to major Hollywood studios. This launched the nascent home video rental market, which was hardly touched by Sony at the time. This ability to take movies home helped the sale of the VHS hardware immensely. Added to this JVC stated in a promotional tape presented by BBC TV legend Cliff Michelmore, that "You'll be able to buy the sort of films the BBC and ITV will never show you, for whatever reason". The adult movie industry adopted VHS as their common format and with a certain level of software availability, hardware sales grew.

=== Other notable achievements ===
In 1979, JVC demonstrated a prototype of its video high density (VHD) disc system. This system was capacitance-based, like capacitance electronic disc (CED), but the discs were groove less with the stylus being guided by servo signals in the disc surface. The VHD discs were initially handled by the operator and played on a machine that looked like an audio LP turntable, but JVC used caddy-housed discs when the system was marketed. Development suffered numerous delays, and the product was launched in 1983 in Japan, followed by the United Kingdom in 1984, to a limited industrial market.

In 1981, JVC introduced a line of revolutionary direct-drive cassette decks, topped by the DD-9, that provided previously unattainable levels of speed stability.

During the 1980s JVC briefly marketed its portable audio equipment similar to the Sony Walkman on the market at the time. The JVC CQ-F2K was released in 1982 and had a detachable radio mounted to the headphones for a compact, wire-free listening experience. JVC had difficulty making the products successful, and a few years later stopped making them. In Japan, JVC marketed the products under the name "Victor".

In 1986, JVC released the HC-95, a personal computer with a 3.58 MHz Zilog Z80A processor, 64 KB RAM, running on MSX Basic 2.0. It included two 3.5" floppy disk drives and conformed to the graphics specification of the MSX-2 standard. However, like the Pioneer PX-7, it also carried a sophisticated hardware interface that handled video superimposition and various interactive video processing features. The JVC HC-95 was first sold in Japan, and then Europe, but sales were disappointing.

JVC video recorders were marketed by the Ferguson Radio Corporation in the UK, with just cosmetic changes. However, Ferguson needed to find another supplier for its camcorders when JVC produced only the VHS-C format, rather than video8. Ferguson was later acquired by Thomson SA, which ended the relationship. JVC later invented hard drive camcorders.

=== 21st century ===
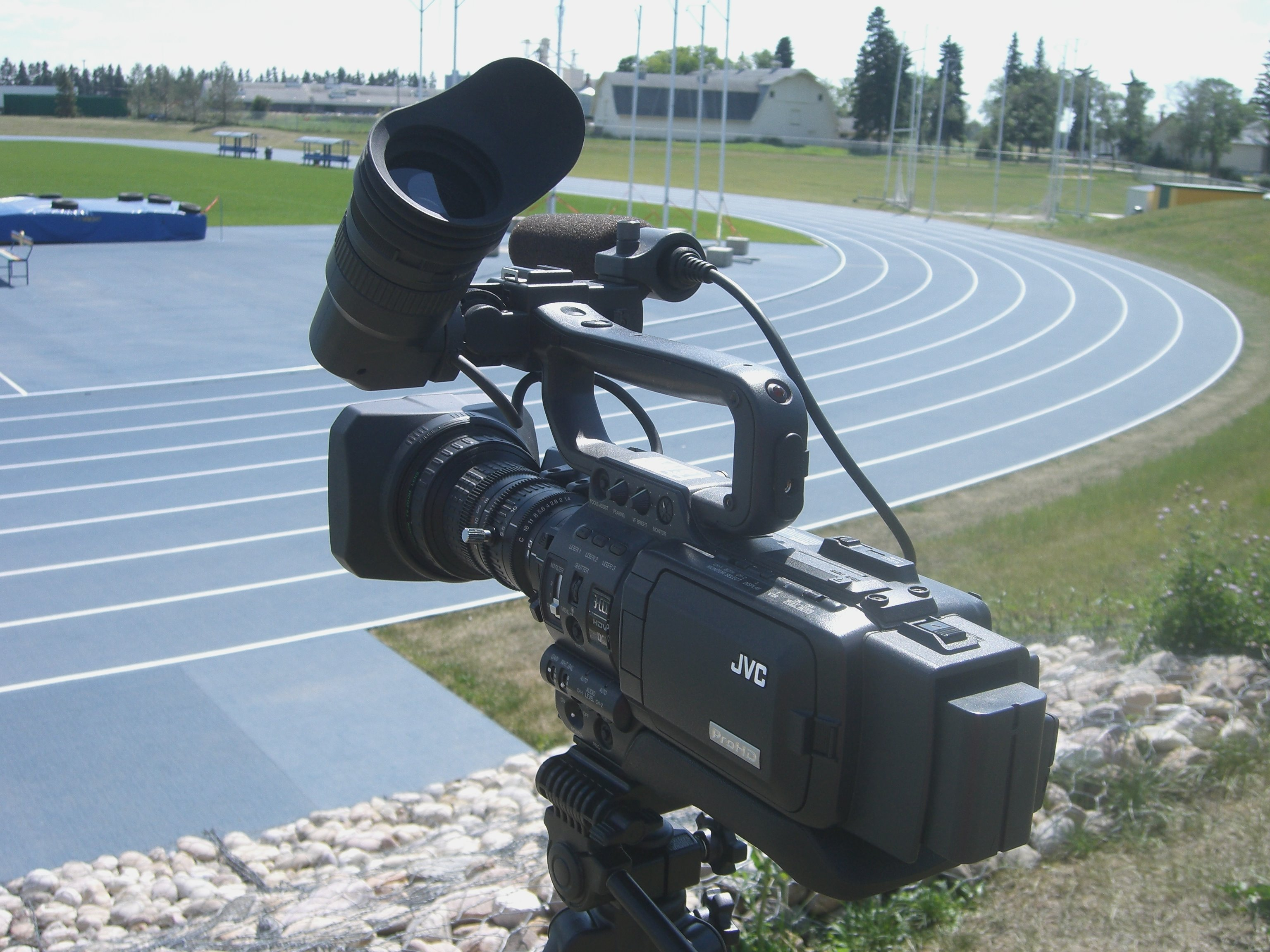
JVC HD100 ProHD video camera (2006)

In October 2001, the National Academy of Television Arts and Sciences presented JVC an Emmy Award for "outstanding achievement in technological advancement" for "Pioneering Development of Consumer Camcorders". Annual sponsorships of the world-renowned JVC Tokyo Video Festival and the JVC Jazz Festival have helped attract the attention of more customers.

JVC has been a worldwide football (soccer) supporter since 1982, having a former kit sponsorship with Arsenal and continuing its role as an official partner of 2002 FIFA World Cup Korea/Japan. JVC made headlines as the first-ever corporate partner of the Kennedy Space Center Visitor Complex. JVC has recently forged corporate partnerships with ESPN Zone and Foxploration. In 2005, JVC joined HANA, the High-Definition Audio-Video Network Alliance, to help establish standards in consumer-electronics interoperability.

In 2005, JVC announced its development of the first DVD-RW DL media (the dual-layer version of the rewritable DVD-RW format).

In December 2006, Matsushita entered talks with Kenwood and Cerberus Capital Management to sell its stake in JVC. In 2007, Victor Company of Japan Ltd confirmed a strategic capital alliance with Kenwood and SPARKX Investment, resulting in Matsushita's holding being reduced to approximately 37%. In March 2008, Matsushita (Panasonic) agreed to spin off the company and merge it with Kenwood Electronics, creating JVCKenwood Holdings on October 1, 2008.

In April 2008, JVC announced that it was closing its TV plants in East Kilbride (Scotland) and Japan. This left it with one plant in Thailand. It stated it would outsource European production to an OEM.

JVC TVs for North America are now being manufactured by AmTRAN Video Corporation along with distribution, service, and warranty under license from JVCKenwood. In Europe, Currys plc, owner of Currys, has a similar arrangement with JVCKenwood.

In Europe, JVC sells mainly some audio accessories, like headphones, and until recently DIN-type car audio. Also in Europe, JVC is present with camcorders, security cameras, audio systems, and with its emblematic boom box, projectors. JVC TV sets in Europe are manufactured mainly by Turkish manufacturer Vestel but are unavailable in all countries.

JVC manufactures car audio head units and speakers for the aftermarket car audio market.

== Sponsorship ==
JVC is a well-known brand among English football fans due to the firm's sponsorship of Arsenal from 1981 to 1999, when Sega took over as Arsenal's sponsors. JVC's 18-year association with Arsenal is one of the longest club-sponsor associations with any professional football club. JVC also sponsored Scottish football club Aberdeen in the late-1980s and early-1990s as well as the FIFA World Cup from 1982 to 2002.

JVC also sponsors the "away" shirts of the Australian A-League club, Sydney FC, and Dutch race driver Christijan Albers.

JVC has also been a sponsor of a massively multiplayer online game called Rise: The Vieneo Province since 2003.

== Brand name ==
Victor used in Japan (1977–2022)

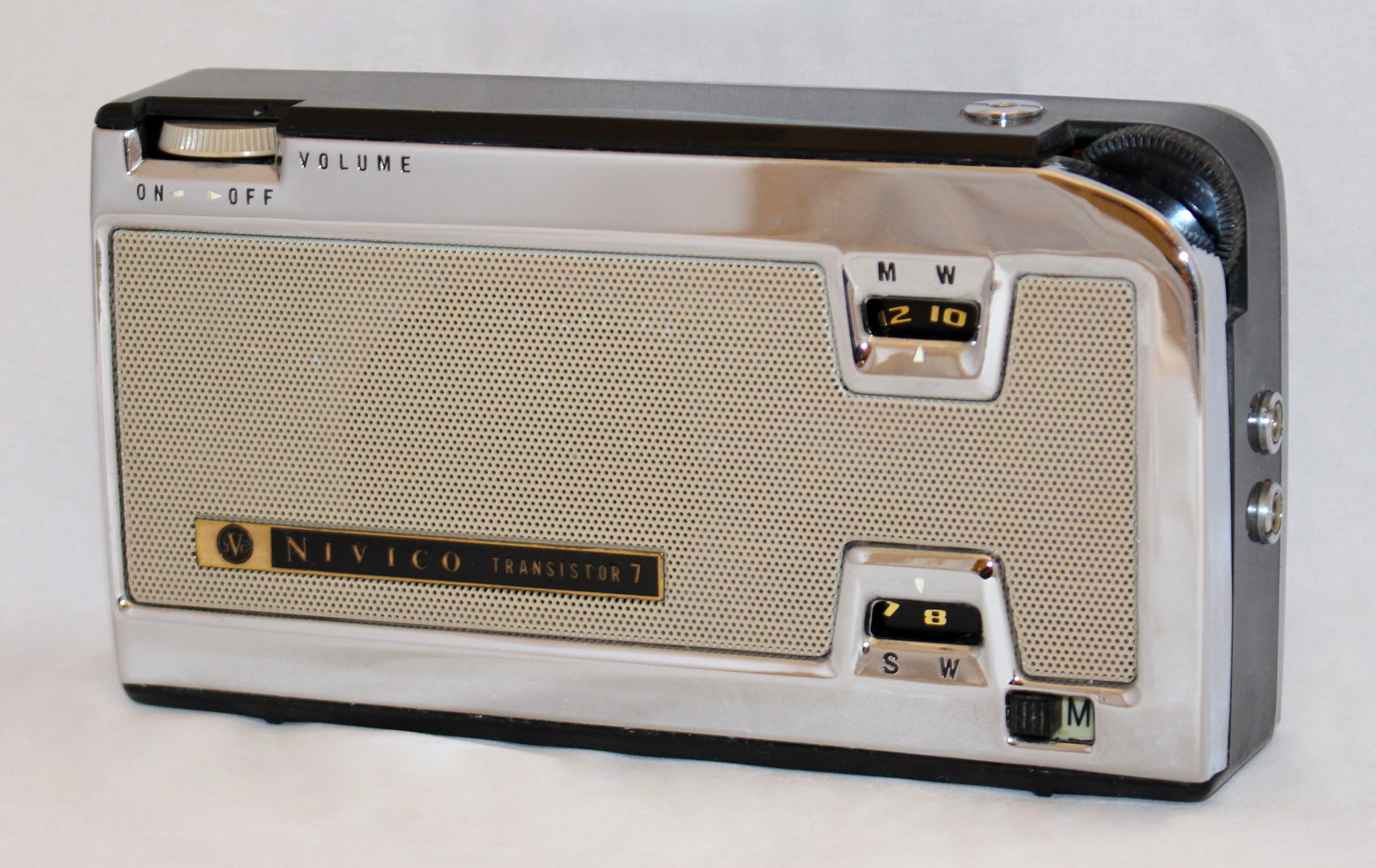
Nivico 7TA-4 Transistor Radio

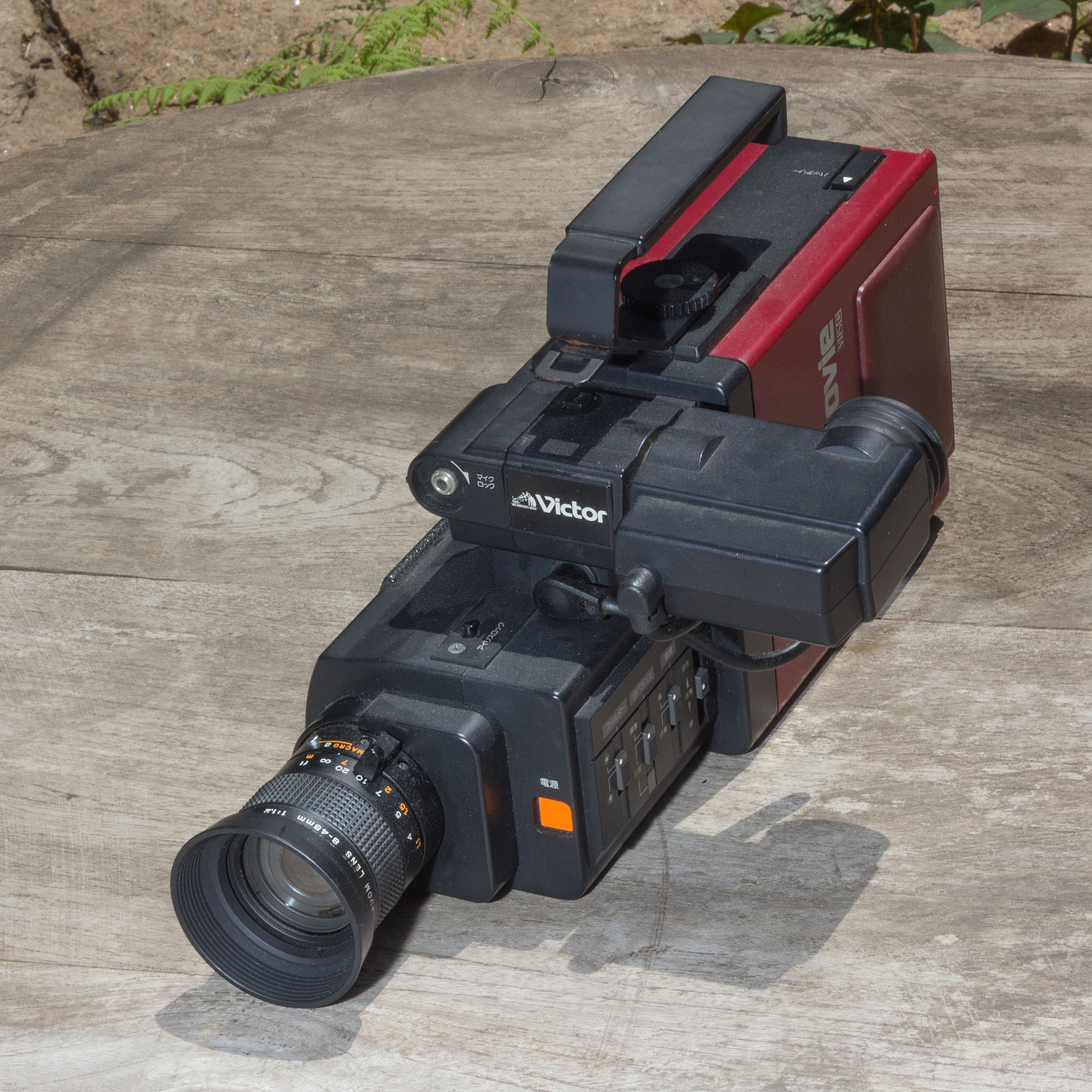
Victor GR-C1

JVC is generally known within Japan by the Victor brand, preceded by the His Master's Voice logo featuring the dog Nipper. Because of a conflict in trademarks between HMV, RCA, and Victor, HMV and RCA are not allowed to use Nipper in Japan. At one time, the company used the Nivico name (for "Nippon Victor Company") overseas, before rebranding to JVC, which stands for Japan's Victor Company. Therefore, the Victor and JVC-Victor web sites looked quite different. Conversely, the entertainment retailer HMV cannot use the His Master's Voice motto or logo in Japan; its logo is a stylized image of a gramophone only. After the Radio Corporation of America (RCA) purchased the Victor Talking Machine Company in 1929 and became RCA Victor in Japan, RCA also had acquired the use of Nipper and His Master's Voice logo, but for use in the Western Hemisphere. In 2011, JVC decided to phase out the "Victor" brand for electronics in Japan, but retained its use for its premium audio products, recording studios Victor Studio, and record label Victor Entertainment.

== Subsidiaries ==
- JVC KENWOOD Marketing India Gurgaon, Haryana, India
- JVC America Inc. – Tuscaloosa, Alabama, US
- JVC Americas Corp – Wayne, New Jersey, US
- JVC Canada Inc. – Mississauga, Ontario, Canada
- JVC Asia – Singapore
- JVC Australia – Australia
- JVC China – China
- JVC Europe – United Kingdom
- JVC Middle-East (and Africa) – Dubai, UAE
- JVC Latin America, S.A. – Panama
- JVC do Brasil Ltda. – Brazil
- JVC International – Austria
- Victor Entertainment

== Product gallery ==
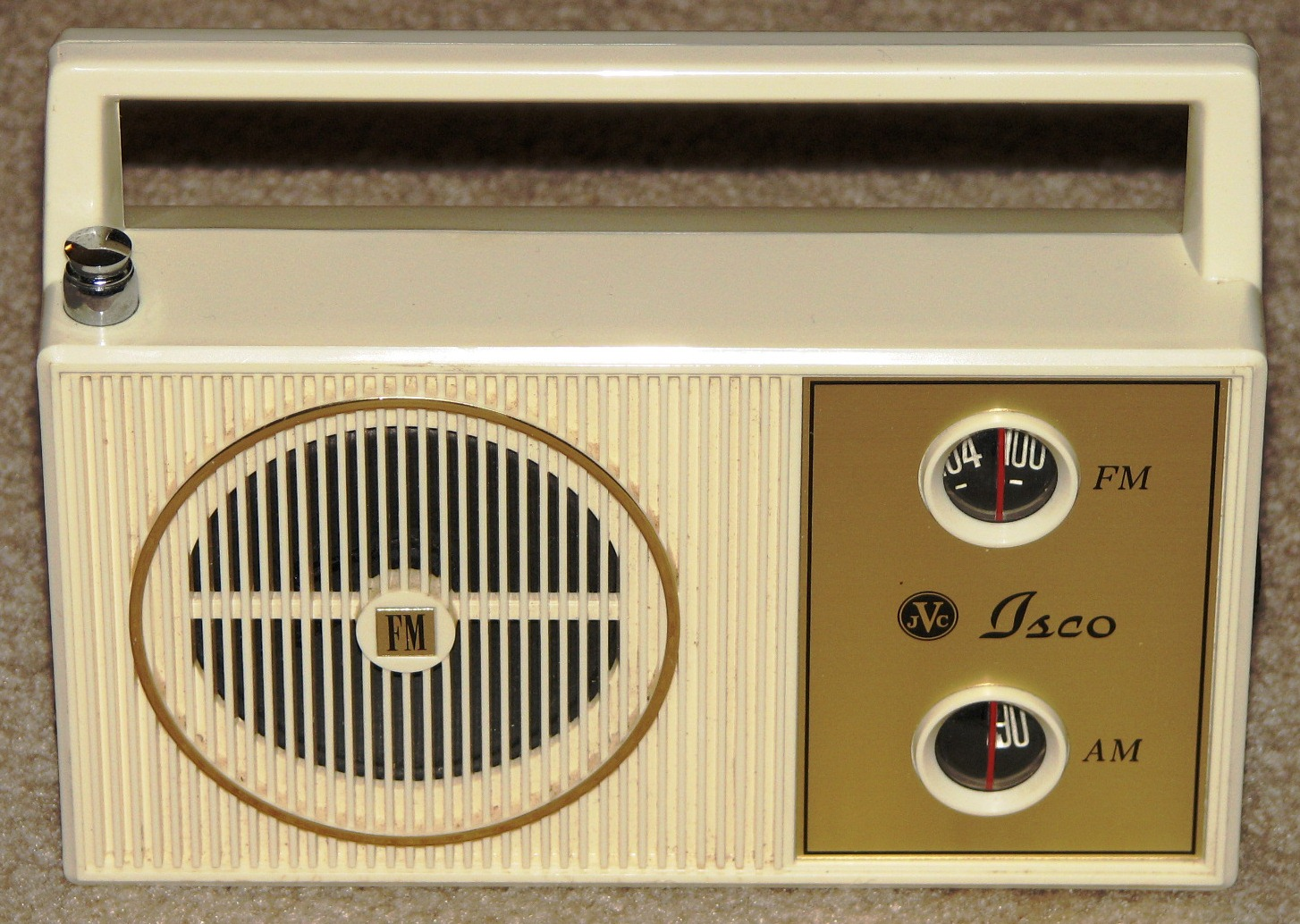
JVC 9F-220C radio

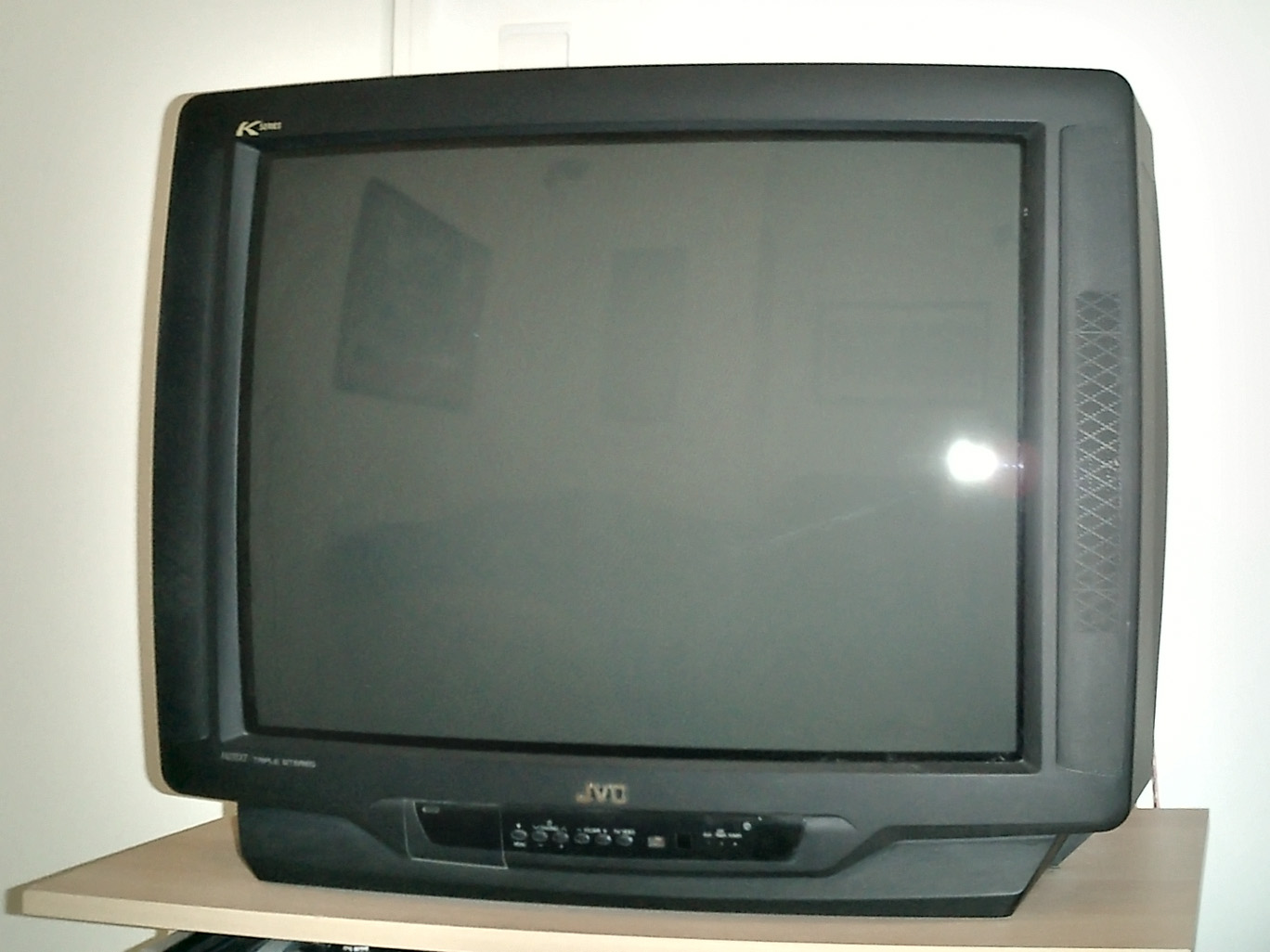
JVC television

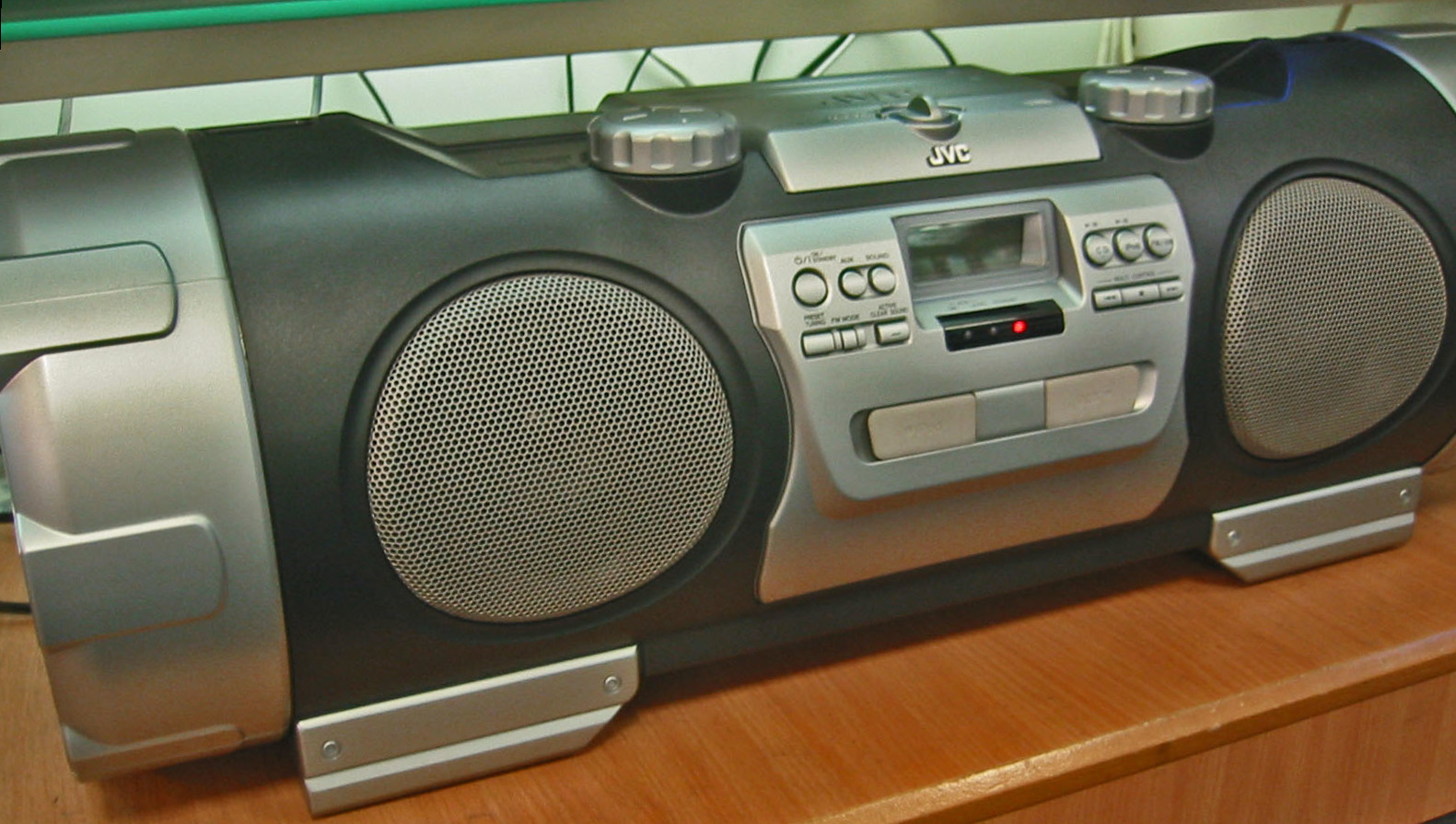
JVC boombox

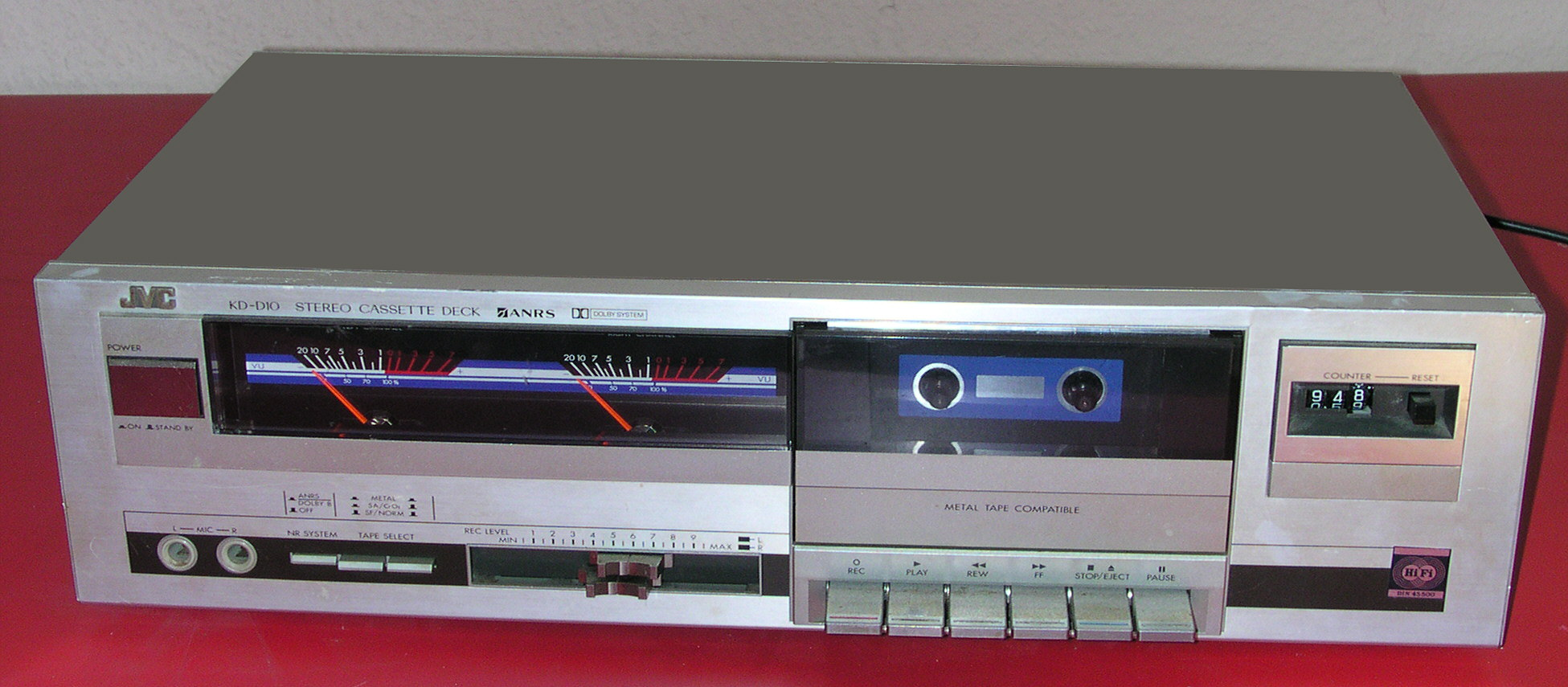
JVC KD-D10E tape deck

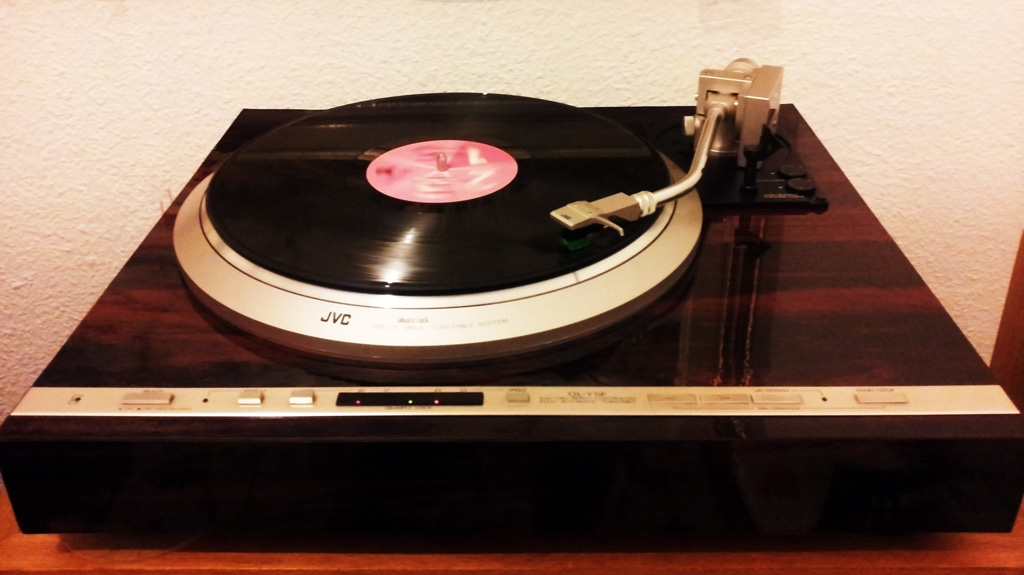
JVC QL-Y5F Direct drive turntable with electronic JVC tonearm

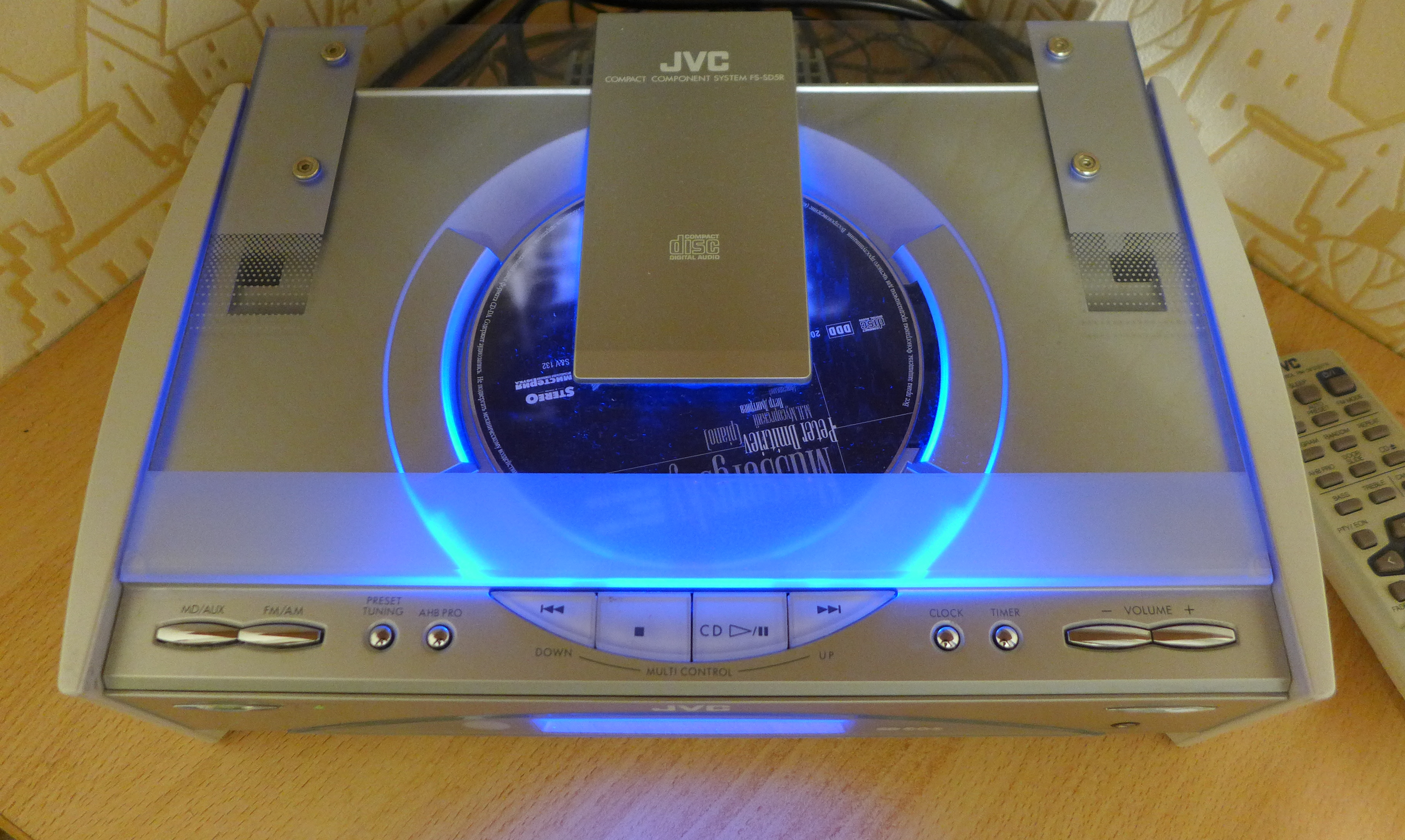
JVC Compact system with CD player

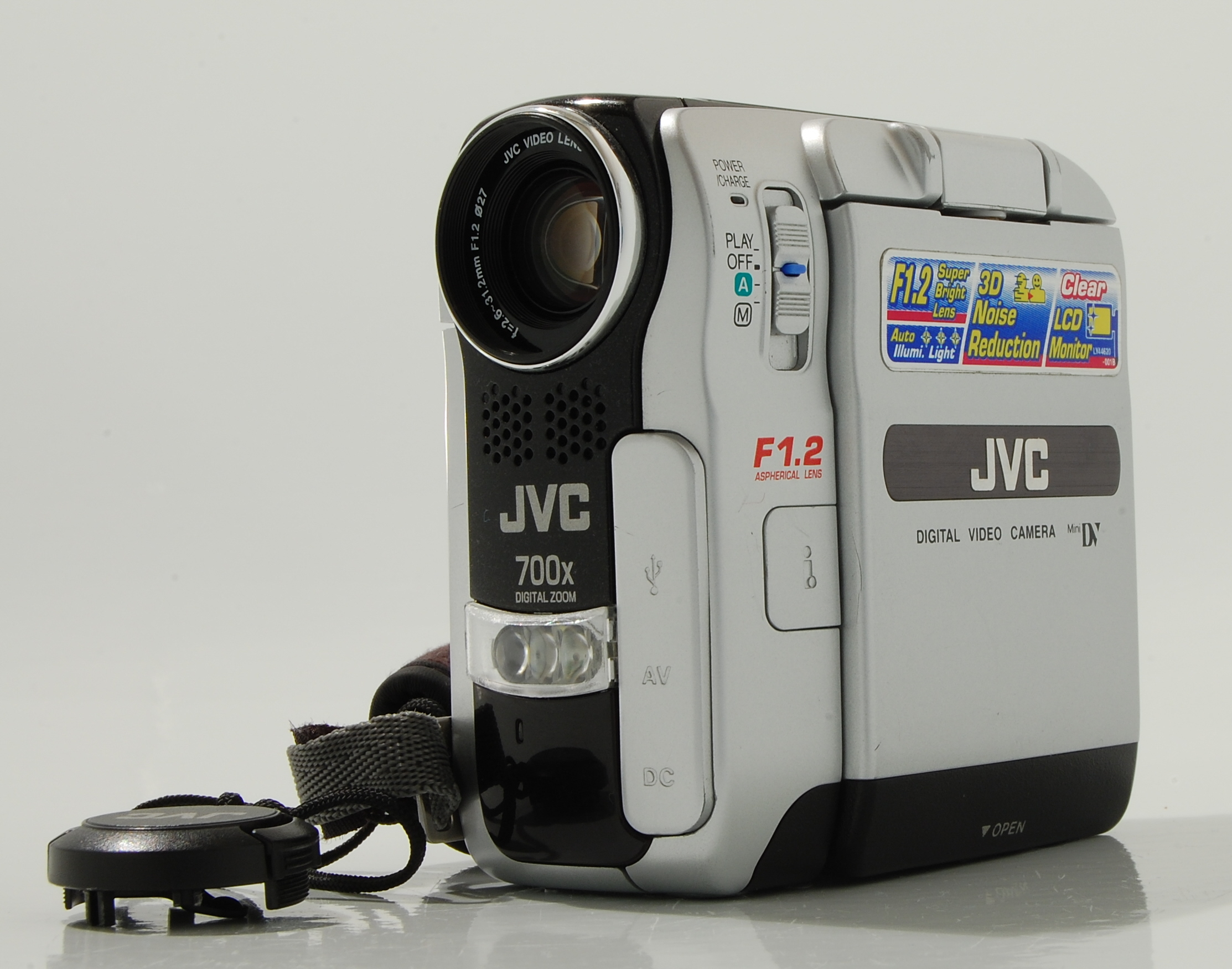
JVC camcorder

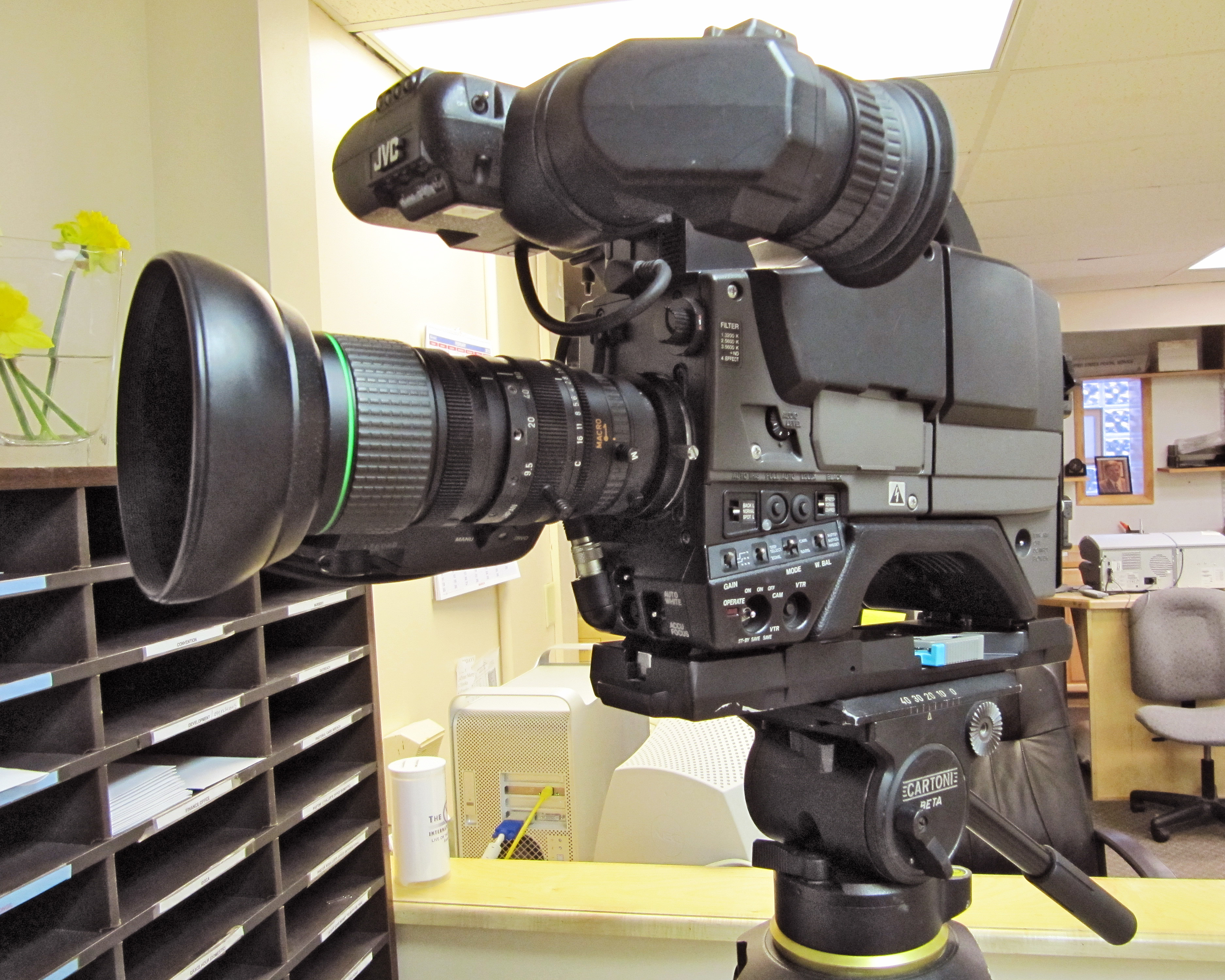
KY D29 Digital-S camcorder

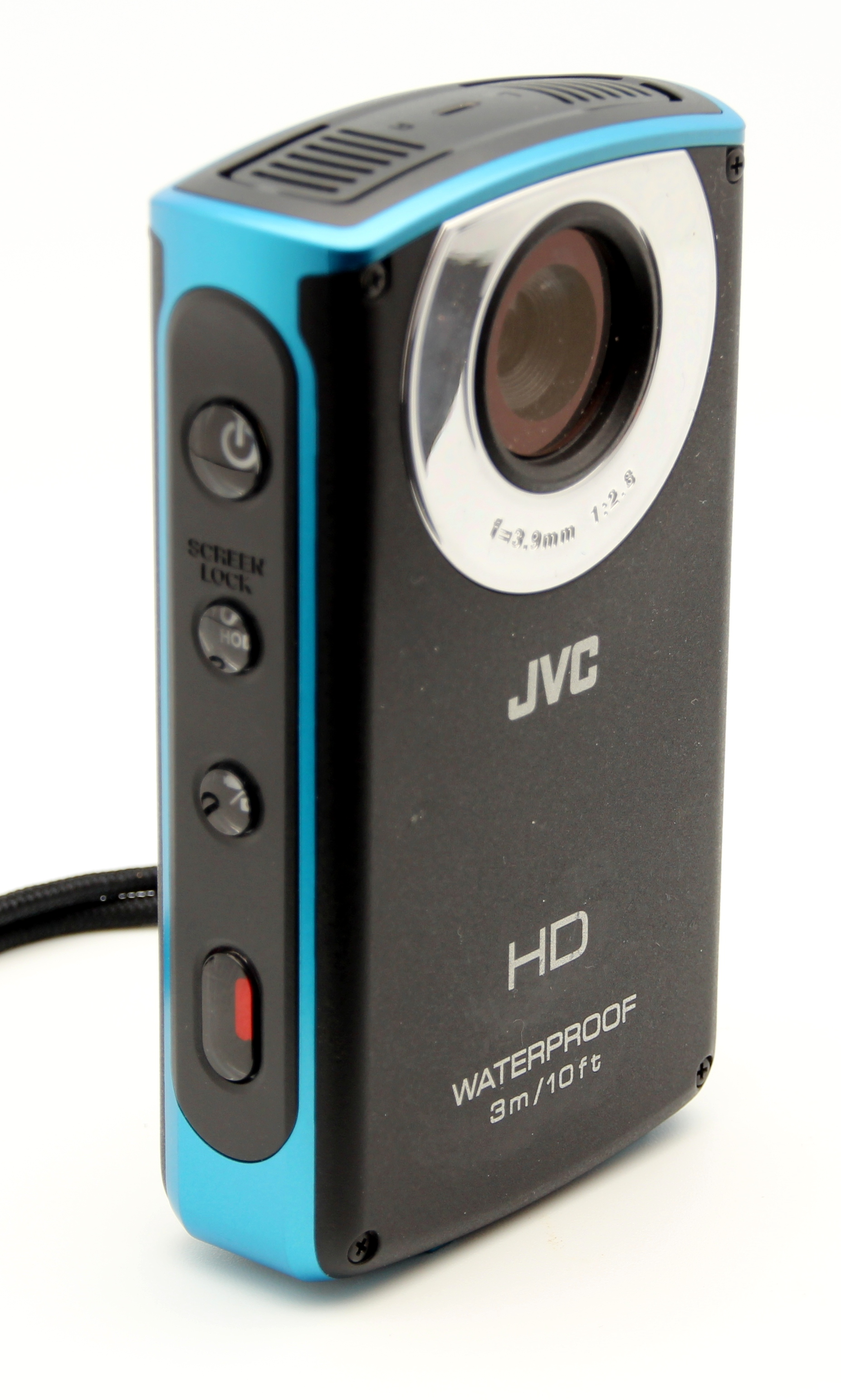
JVC Picsio pocket camcorder

== See also ==
- List of digital camera brands
- List of home computers
- Mitsubishi Electric
- Taiyo Yuden (partner with JVC)
- Video
  - D-VHS
  - W-VHS
  - Videotape
  - Video tape recorder
  - Videocassette recorder
- Wondermega
- XRCD
