= Betamovie =

Sony brand of camcorders

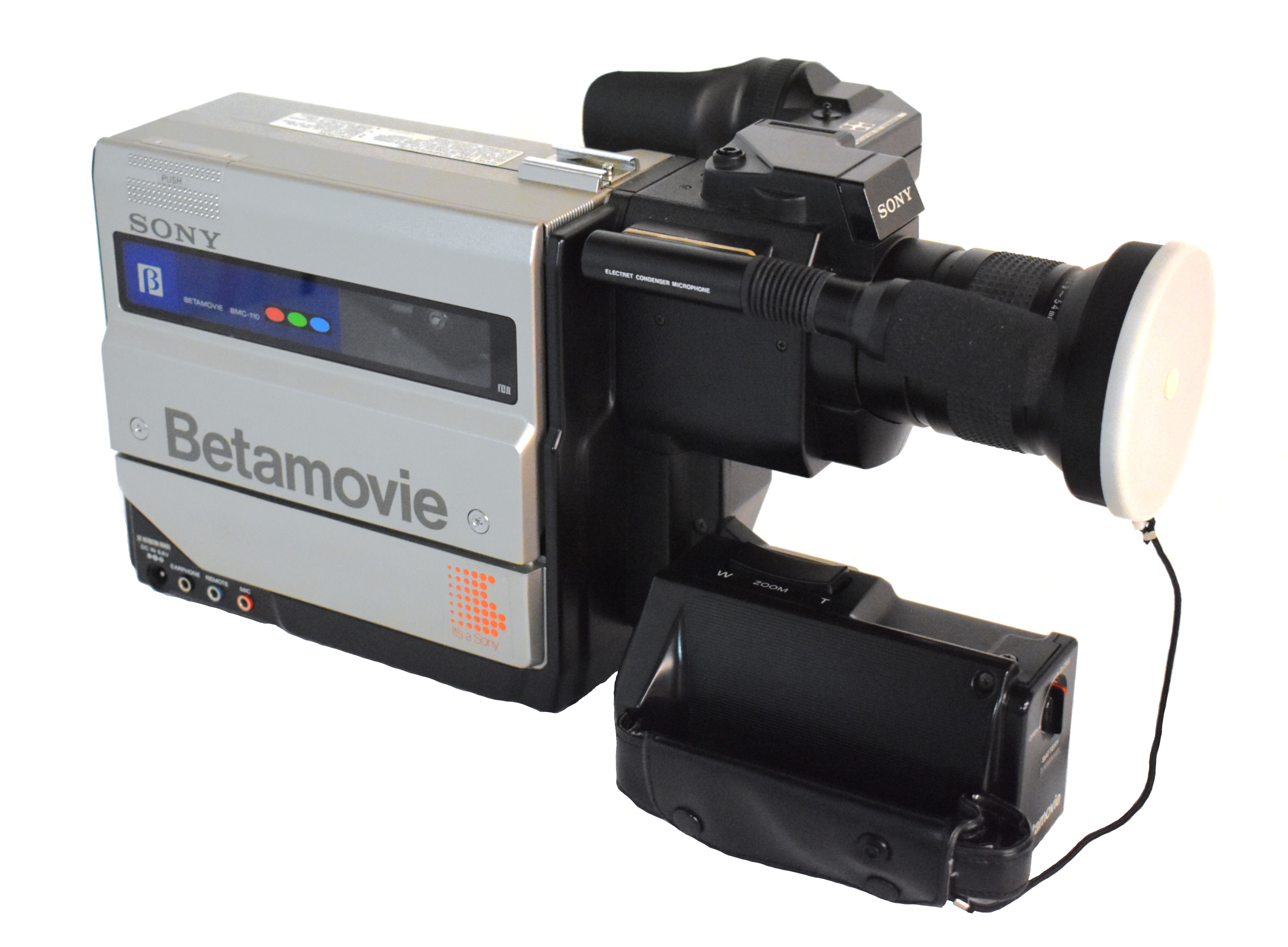
- The first Betamovie model, the BMC-110.
- Introduced: May 1983
- Encoding: NTSC, PAL
- Recording media: Betamax cassette

Recording time on L-830 cassette:
- PAL: Up to 216 min.
- NTSC: βI: 100 min. βII: 200 min. βIII: 300 min.
- Write mechanism: Single head Helical scan
- Playback: Not available
- Intended usage: Home movies
- Market: Consumer/Amateur
- Developed by: Sony

Betamovie is a series of consumer-grade camcorders developed by Sony for the Betamax videotape format. As a camcorder, each unit combined a video camera and a video recorder into a single device. Betamovie camcorders recorded onto standard Betamax cassettes.

Sony produced models for both the PAL and NTSC video standards; the first models, the BMC-100P (PAL) and BMC-110 (NTSC), were released in 1983, making Betamovie the world’s first commercial consumer-grade camcorder. While only standard Betamax units were available in PAL regions, several SuperBeta models were released for the NTSC market.

Due to design limitations, Betamovie camcorders lacked playback capability and could only record video. This restriction, combined with the decline of the Betamax format in the late 1980s, led Sony to discontinue the Betamovie line after just a few years and shift its focus to the newer Video8 format.

== History ==
After the introduction of 1/2" VHS and Betamax formats in the mid-1970s, videocassette recorders (VCR) started gaining mass market traction—by 1982, 10% of UK households owned a VCR. The first two-piece camera/VCR systems emerged in around 1980. These units included a portable VCR, which the user would carry on a shoulder strap, and a separate camera, which was connected to the VCR by a special cable. These systems were cumbersome and heavy. For example, the portable Sony SL-3000 VCR from 1980 weighed around 9 kg without the battery. The accompanying camera (e.g. HVC-2000P) would weigh around 3 kg Thus, the complete setup could easily weigh in excess of 13 kg.

In order to be more appealing to the typical consumer wanting a practical device for recording home movies, a more compact and preferably one-piece device was needed. The first such device, the Betamovie BMC-100/110, was released in 1983 by Sony. Although the term was not in common use at that time, such a device would later become known as a camcorder, a single unit comprising a video camera and a video recorder. The BMC-100/110 weighed just 2.5 kg and was a much less cumbersome solution than its predecessors. The whole device could be supported on a user's shoulder. In order to achieve such weight and size reductions, several key components had to be miniaturized. One major requirement for a one-piece camcorder was miniaturizing the recording head drum. Sony's solution to this involved recording a non-standard video signal which would become standard only when played back on full-sized VCRs. A side effect of this was that Betamovie camcorders were record-only. As instant playback is one of the main advantages of video cameras over cine-cameras, lack of a playback function presented a considerable limitation and effectively limited Betamovie to those who already owned the Betamax VCRs required to view their recordings.

In 1984, JVC presented its own version of a camcorder, the GR-C1, for the VHS-C format. Although it too had a miniature head drum, the JVC engineers developed a different solution to drum miniaturization, which made it possible to record a standard video signal on the tape, so the user of a VHS camcorder could review footage on location and copy it to another VCR for editing. Sony was unable to duplicate this functionality, and this Betamovie failing was a primary reason for its early loss of market share.

Despite this development, Sony held on to the Betamovie for a couple of years more, releasing some more advanced models, especially for the NTSC market. However, in 1987, Sony finally abandoned the Betamovie in favor of its newly developed Video8 format.

== Technical overview ==
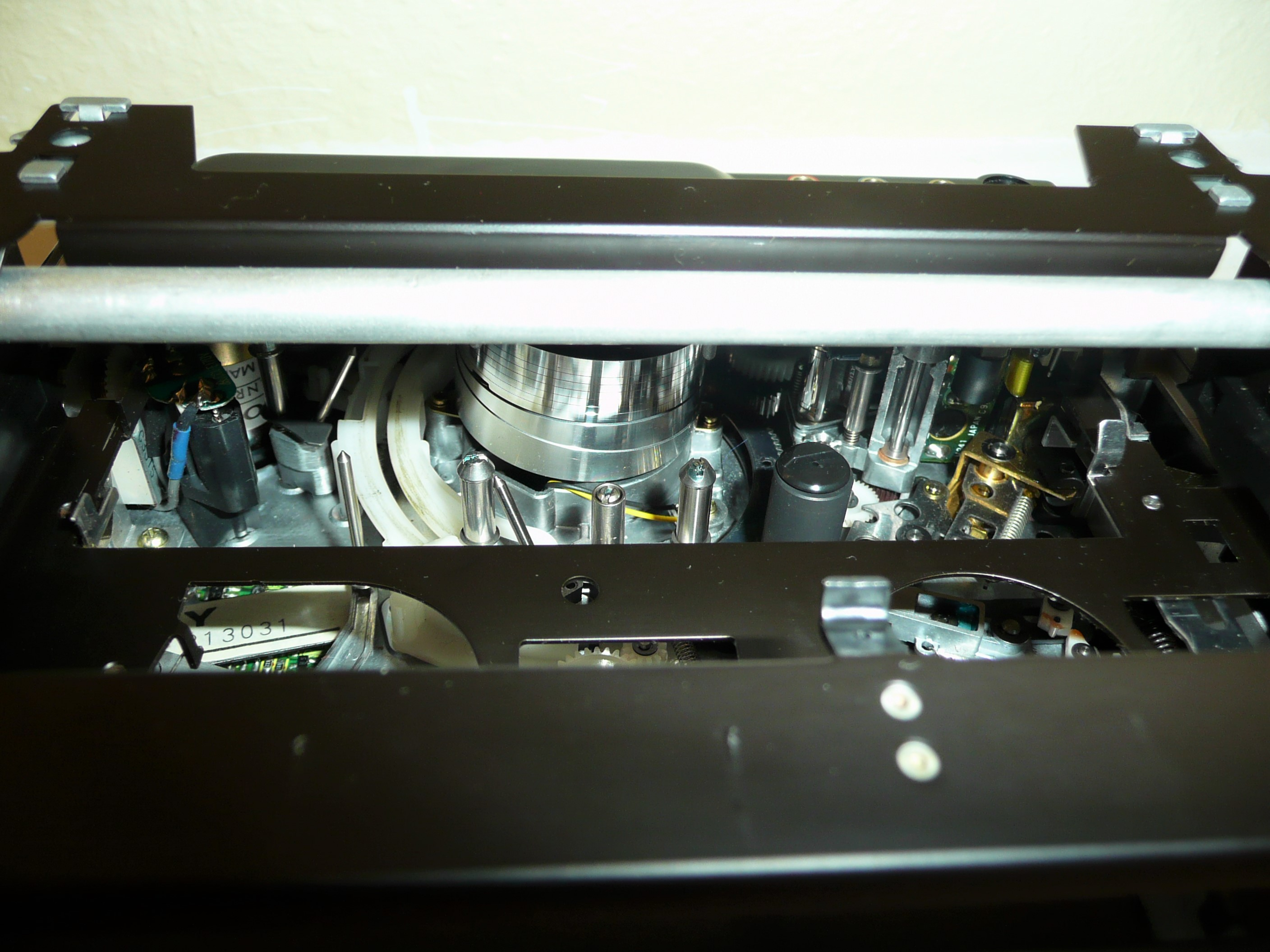
Head drum and lacing mechanism of BMC-100P.

Betamovie uses a standard-size Betamax cassette, and the recordings produced are in standard Betamax format, suitable for playback on a standard Beta deck.

However, in order to achieve the necessary miniaturisation, a non-standard recording method and head design are used. As a result of this, Betamovie camcorders themselves are record-only and do not support playback of recordings.

=== Non-standard recording method ===
Unlike in Betamax VCRs, the tape is wrapped 300° around a miniaturised head drum nearly 45 mm in diameter with a single dual-azimuth head to write the video tracks, using a special tape transport reminiscent of that of VHS (in that the tape is wrapped around the head drum in a similar manner, but with a more extreme wrap). Compared to the normal Betamax head drum of 75 mm, the Betamovie head drum spins at 2500 rpm rather than 1500 rpm. The fields on the tape are written at 120% (i.e. six-fifths) the normal speed.

Due to the use of a single-head drum combined with the not-quite-complete 300° (five-sixths) wrap, the head is out of contact with the tape and unable to record around one-sixth of the time. This means that the complete signal must be (in effect) slightly "time compressed" to "fit in" to the period during which the tape is still in contact with the head.

Betamovie achieves this by making the tape-to-head speed slightly higher than normal (20% faster or six-fifths the usual speed) and "overscanning" the camera tube, i.e. reading more lines than necessary at the periphery. Effectively, the higher speed means that the head can traverse the full tape sweep in five-sixths of the usual time, and covers the gap during the remainder.

The timing, and number of extra scan lines, are arranged such that the lines "lost" (due to being output during the unrecordable "gap" period) are the unwanted "overscan" lines. This means that the full complement of "regular" lines (525 for NTSC) will have been scanned and recorded successfully during the period that the head was in contact with the tape.

The result — by design — is a recording that is in standard Betamax format, and which appears normal when played back at normal speed on a standard Betamax VCR. However, due to the non-standard timing and head design, Betamovie camcorders themselves are record-only, and in-camcorder playback (including preview and dubbing) is not possible.

=== Other aspects ===
The early models have an optical viewfinder, which lets one see exactly what one is recording by looking directly through the lens, via a system of mirrors and prisms, similar to an SLR stills camera. Some later models feature an electronic viewfinder, although they remain record-only without the through-viewfinder playback supported by some non-Betamovie camcorders.

Early models use a cathode ray tube as their image sensor and the BMC-100/110 has manual focus. Later models use CCD image sensors instead and feature autofocus.

All Betamovies for the PAL format record in standard Betamax video mode. Some of the models for the NTSC format can record in the enhanced SuperBeta mode or even the Super Hi-Band Beta mode.

== Models ==
=== BMC-100P and BMC-110 ===
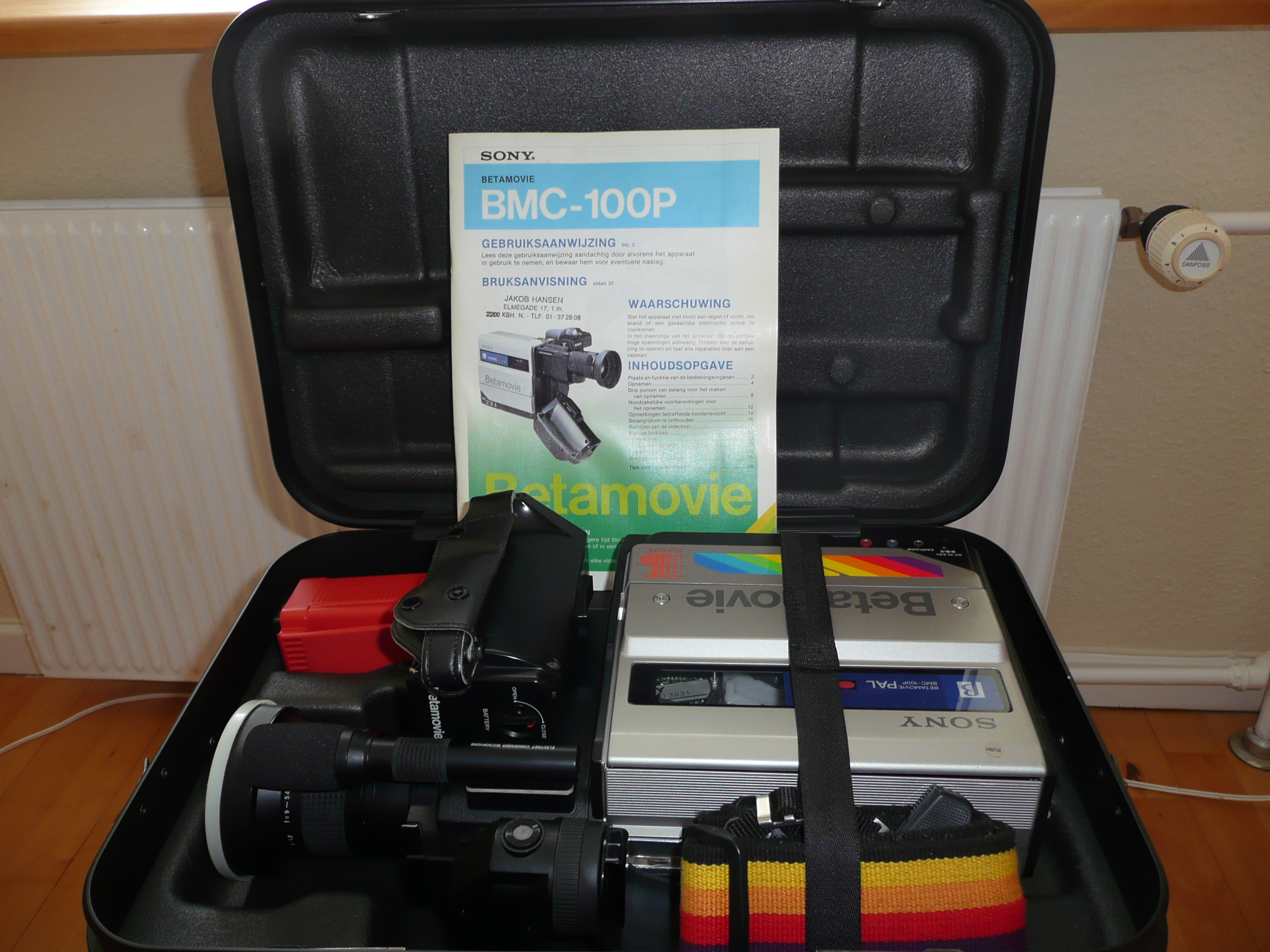
BMC-100P in carrying case.

Released in May 1983. The first model and the world's first consumer grade camcorder. BMC-100P is the PAL model and BMC-110 is the NTSC model.

The camera uses a SMF Trinicon tube as its image sensor. It features 6X power zoom, manual focus, and an optical viewfinder. It requires 35 Lux to operate. The BMC-110 only records in BII.

=== BMC-200P and BMC-220 ===
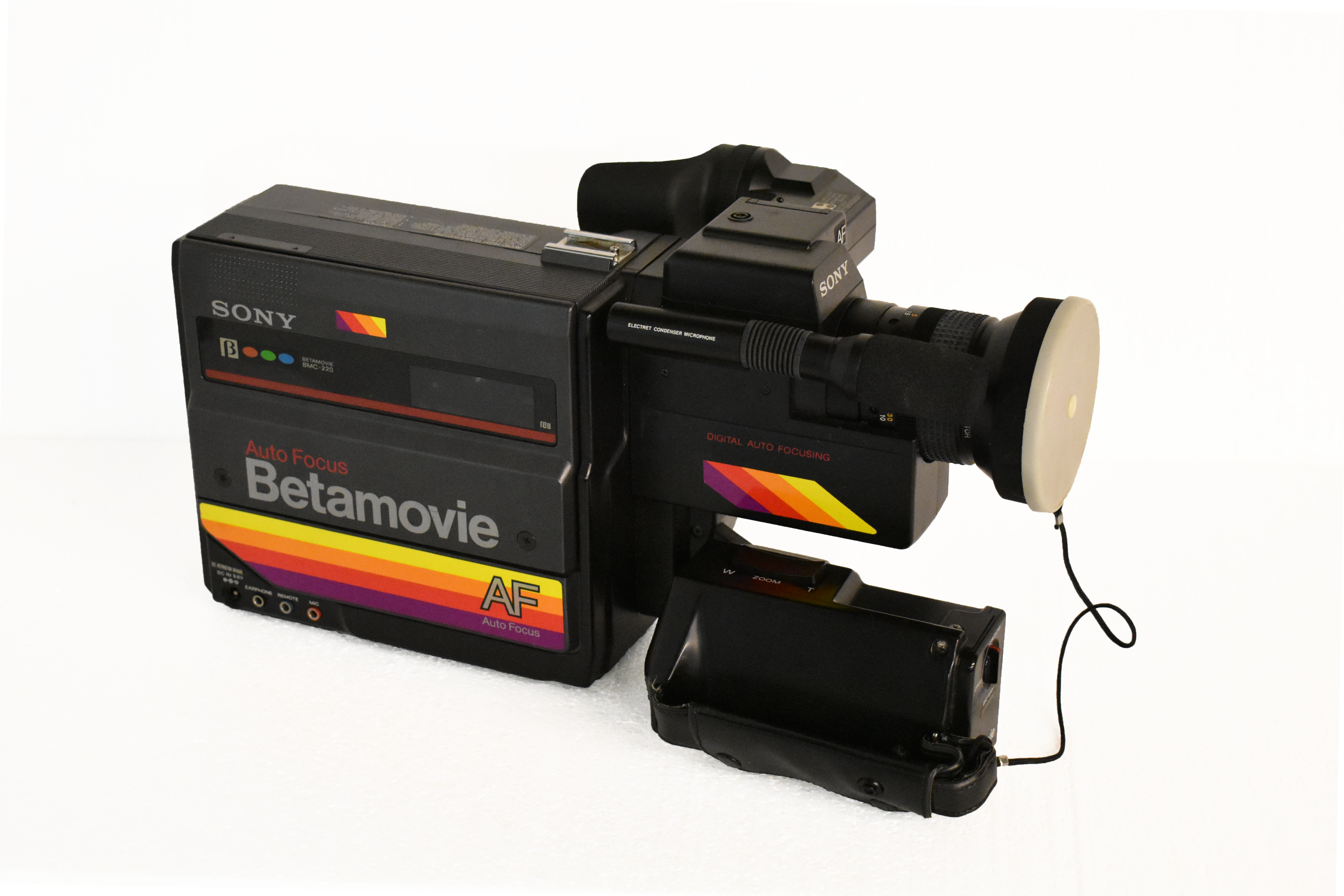
The front of a BMC-220.

This camera features auto-focus. Apart from this, it is identical to the first model.

=== BMC-500 and BMC-550 ===
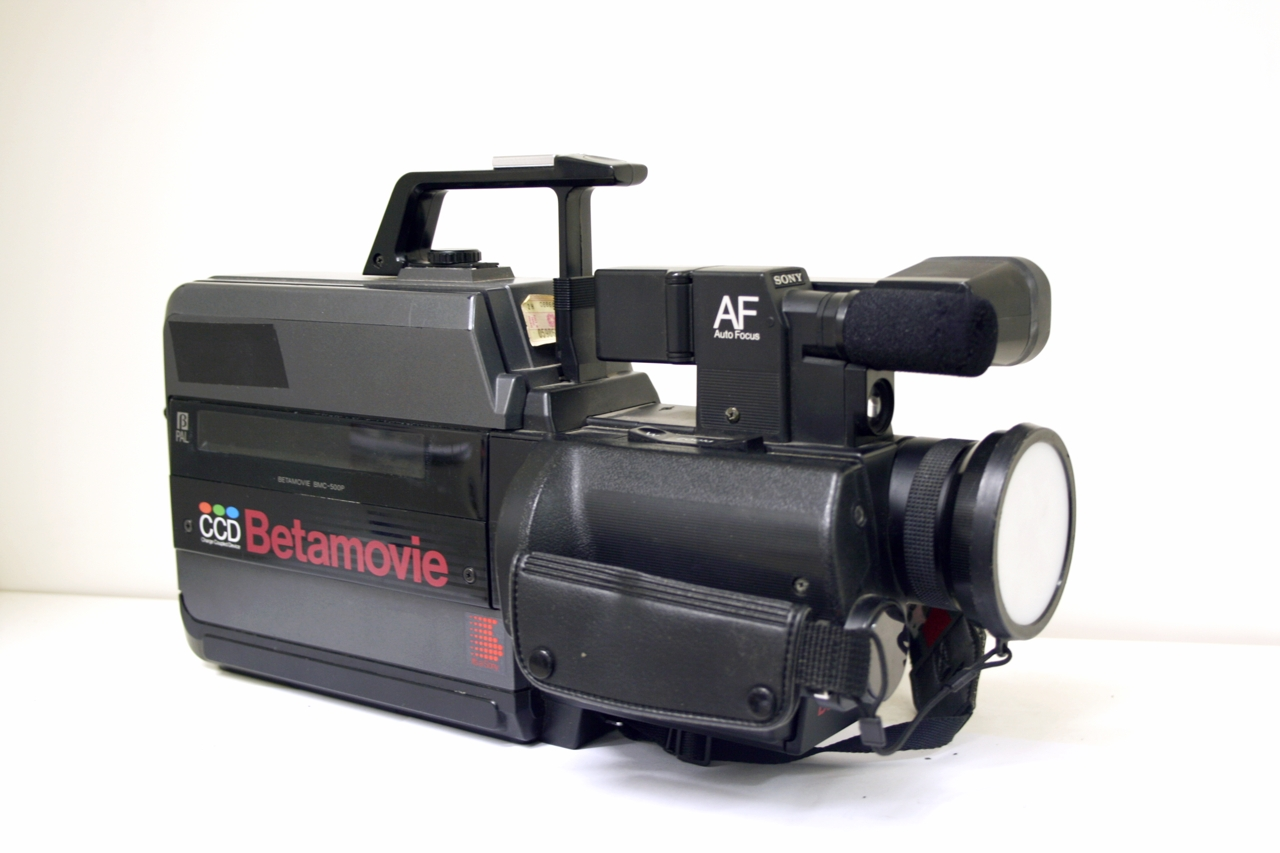
Sony BMC-500.

Released in 1985. A substantial redesign. This camera uses a CCD sensor and features time and date settings. BMC-500 is the last PAL Betamovie.

=== GCS-1 ===
Released in 1985. NTSC model. This is an industrial/professional camcorder. It is similar to BMC-660. However, like BMC-1000, it features an electronic viewfinder.

=== BMC-660 ===
Released in 1986. NTSC model. This camera records in SuperBeta mode, BII only.

=== BMC-1000 ===
Released in 1987. NTSC model. An upgraded model. Features an electronic viewfinder and records in SuperBeta BI and Super Hi-Band Beta BI. It is still a record-only unit.

== EDC-55 ED-Beta camcorder ==
EDC-55 became the final and most advanced iteration of camcorders for the Betamax format. It is a semiprofessional/prosumer device that only records in the ED-Beta format, the final high-definition variant of the Betamax format. This camera produces over 550 lines of resolution, records in Hi-Fi stereo and features insert audio and video editing. Unlike the Betamovie camcorders, it can play back its own recordings. It was only released for the NTSC format.

== Accessories ==
=== AC Adapter/battery charger (AC-M100, AC-M110, BC-300) ===
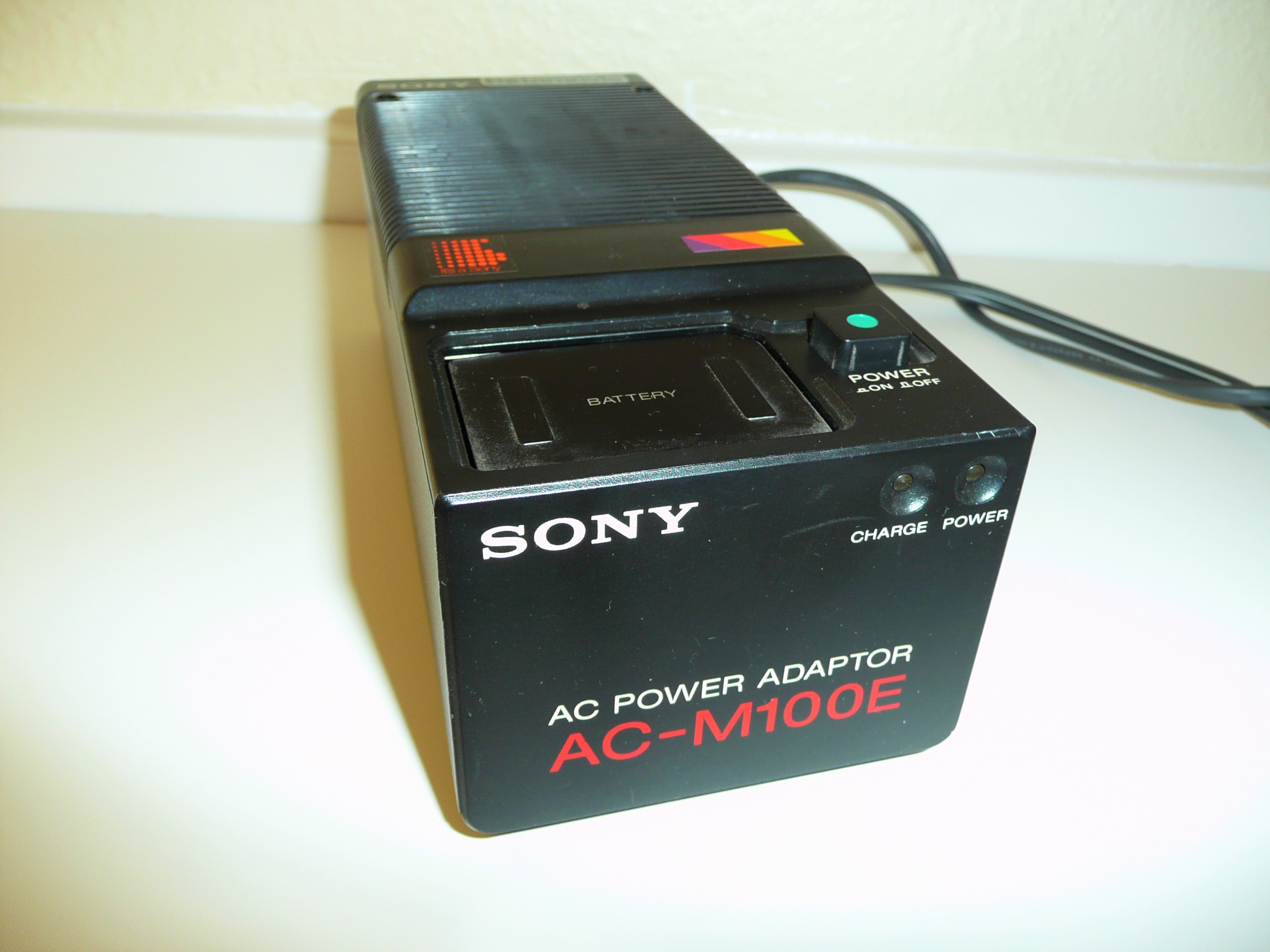
AC Adapter AC-M100E.

The AC-M100/110 is a combined AC Adapter and charger for a single NP-11 rechargeable battery. The output voltage to the camera is 9,6 V, 1 A. The battery is charged with 14 V, 1,2 A.

The principal difference between the M100 and M110 appears to be that the M100 can run on 110-240 V AC while the M110 can run on 100-240 V AC.

The BC-300 can charge three NP-11 batteries simultaneously.

=== Rechargeable battery (NP-11) ===
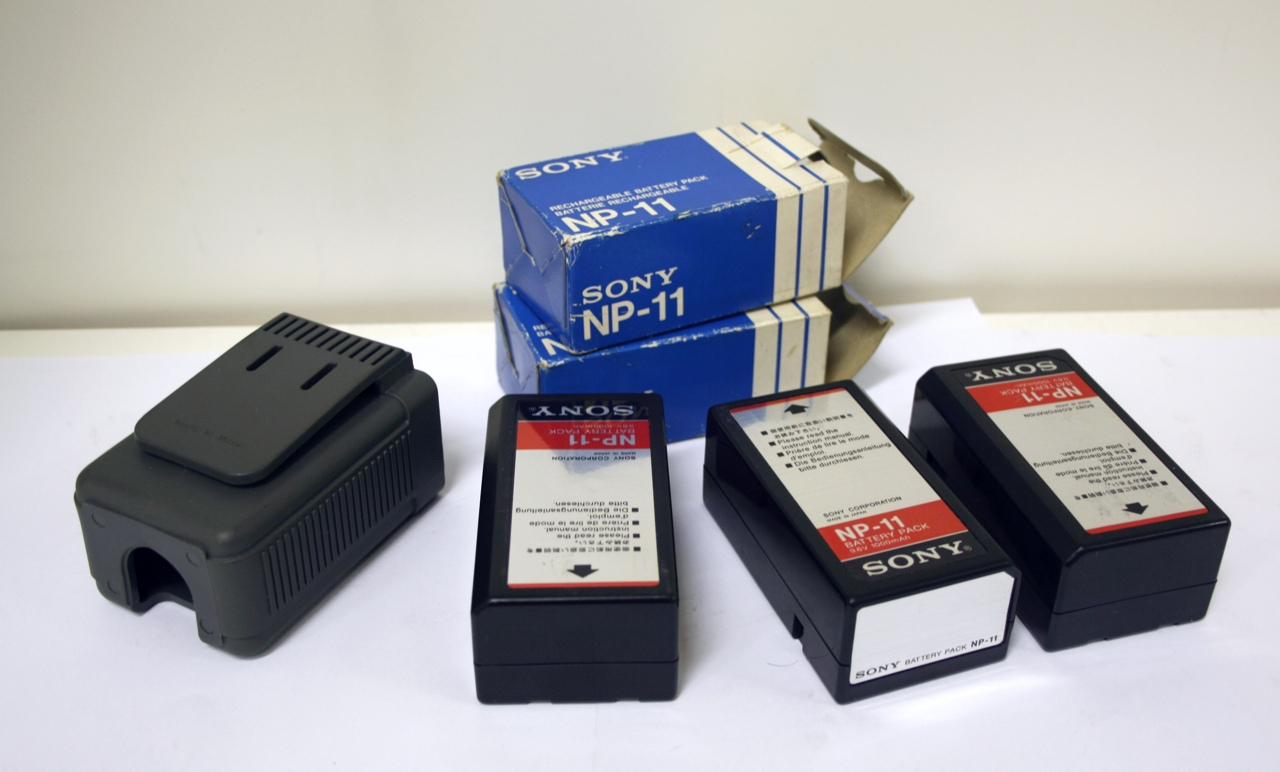
NP-11 battery.

A Ni-Cad battery providing approximately one hour of continuous operation.

=== Carrying case (LC-710, LC-720, LC-760, LC-770) ===
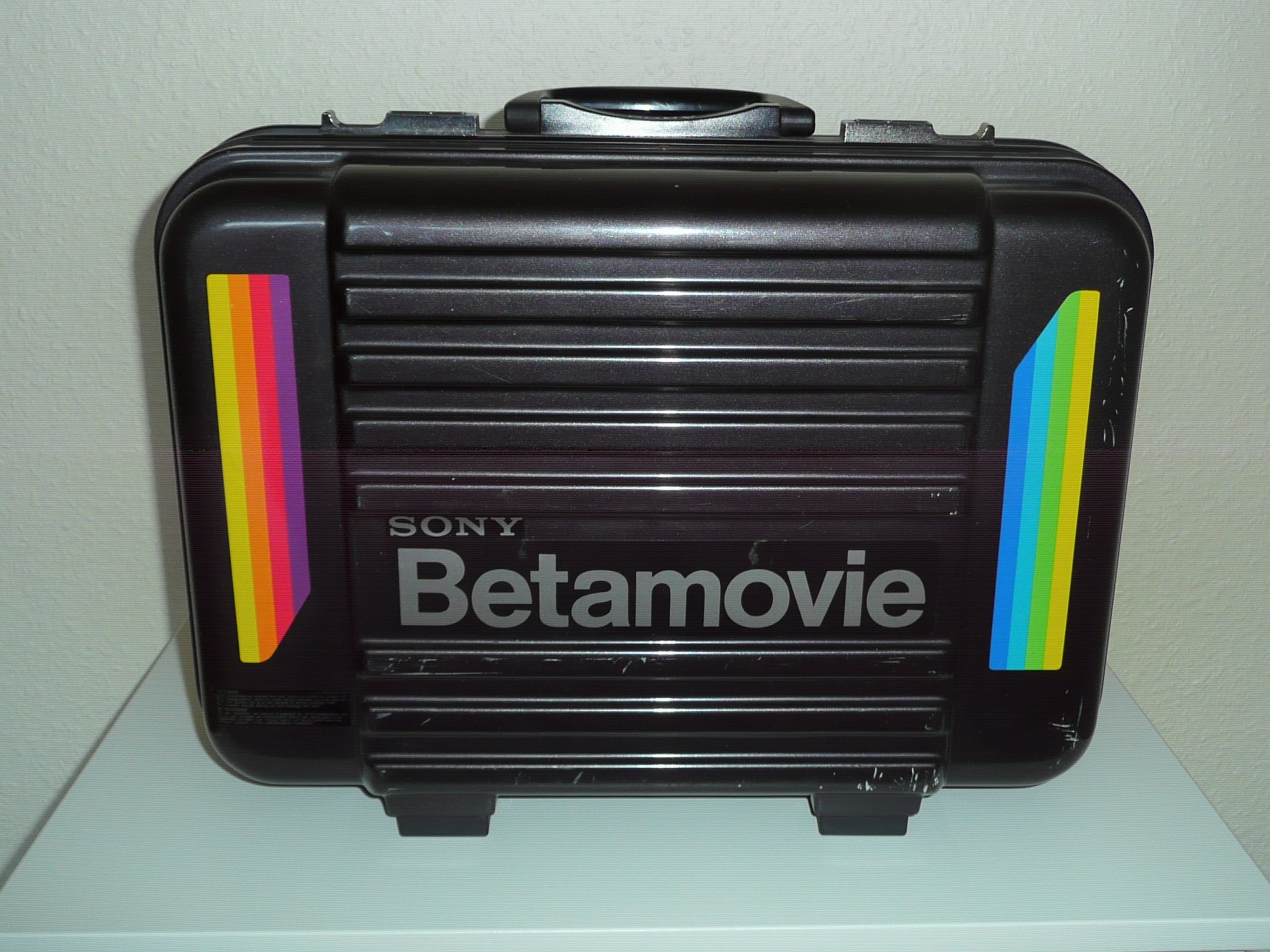
LC-720 carrying case.

A hard shell carrying case.

LC-710 and LC-720 are designed for the BMC-100/110/200/220. The larger LC-710 can hold the camcorder, two NP-11 batteries and an AC-M100/110 adapter. The smaller LC-720 has no room for an AC-power adapter.

LC-760 is for the BMC-500/550/660. It can hold the camcorder, two NP-11 batteries and a BC-300 adapter.

LC-770 is for the GCS-1 and BMC-1000. It can hold the camcorder, two NP-11 batteries and a BC-300 adapter.

=== Jacket (LC-810, LC-850) ===
LC-810 is a flexible jacket for protecting the body of a BMC-100/110/200/220.

LC-850 is for BMC-500/550/660.

=== External microphone shoe (SAD-100) ===
An externally mounted boom microphone shoe.

=== External microphone (ECM-K100, ECM-Z300) ===
ECM-K100 is a supercardioid microphone which picks up a specific sound source while cutting out extraneous surrounding noise. It requires a single size AA battery

ECM-Z300 is a zoom microphone which picks up sound from a large area to a more restricted frontal area. It requires a single 9V battery.

=== Remote control (RM-81) ===
A wired remote control with a Record/Pause button.

=== Car adapter (DCC-2600) ===
A car adapter with cable for connecting to the cigarette lighter socket in a car.

=== Battery belt (BP-400) ===
A battery belt worn around the waist which provides approximately 4 hours of operating time.

=== Cassette rewinder/eraser (BE-V50) ===
Used to quickly rewind or erase any Beta cassette tape.

=== Tripod (VCT-150K) ===
Heavy duty tripod with smooth panning and tilting. Supplied with carrying bag.

=== Video head cleaning cassette (L-25CL) ===
Cassette used to clean the video heads.

== See also ==
- VHS-C – competing camcorder tape format
- Handycam – Sony's successor to the Betamovie
- Video8 – successor videocassette format to Betamax for camcorders
