= RCA Corporation =

American electronics company (1919–1988)

- RCA logo by Lippincott & Margulies, used from 1968 to 1987. Still in use by the RCA brand and RCA Records.

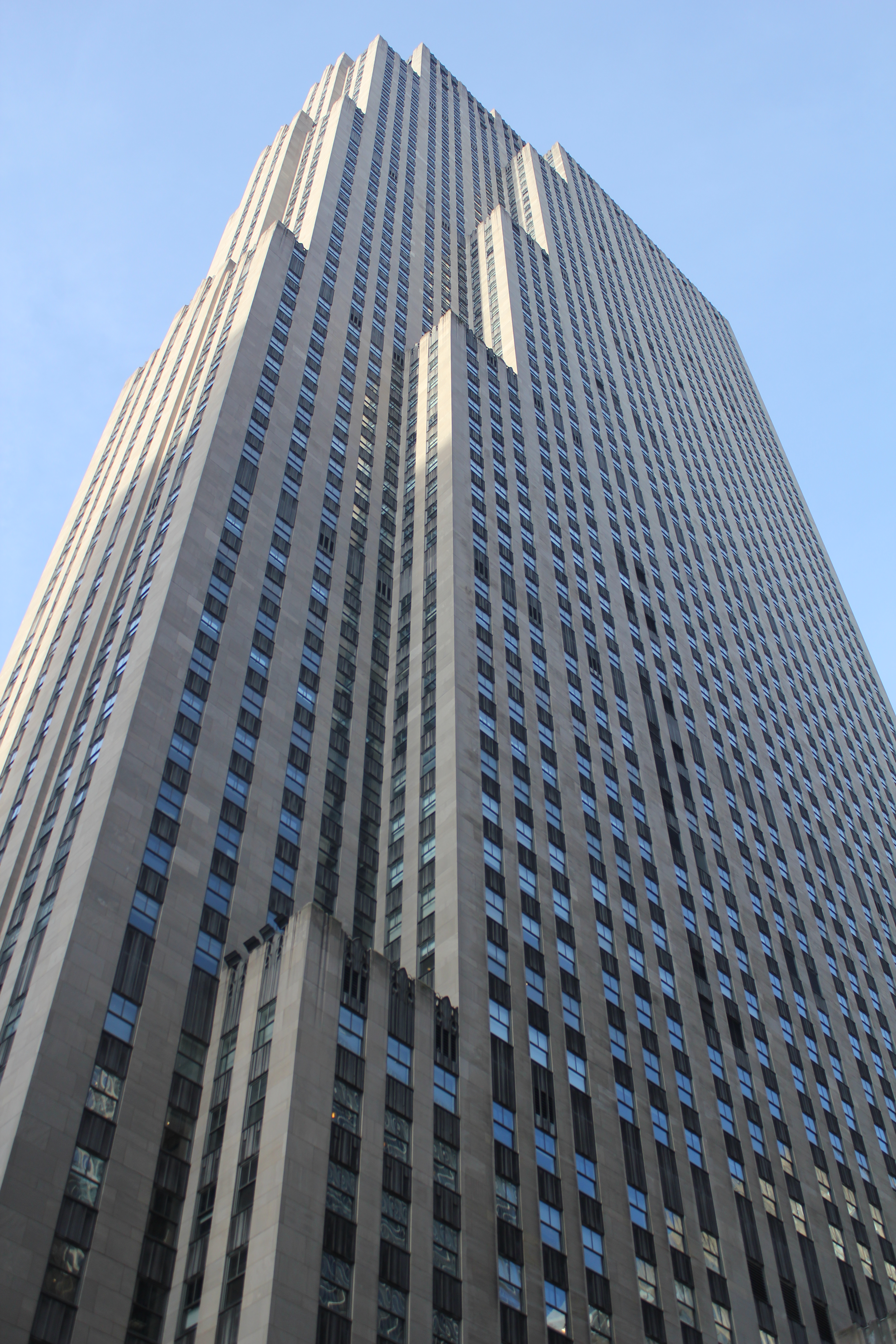
- RCA's former headquarters at 30 Rockefeller Plaza, 1933–1987
- Type: Subsidiary
- Traded as: NYSE: RCA
- Industry: Media; Electronics
- Predecessor: Marconi Wireless Telegraph Company of America
- Founded: November 20, 1919; 107 years ago as the Radio Corporation of America
- Founder: Owen D. Young
- Defunct: 1987; 39 years ago
- Fate: Acquired by GE in 1986, various divisions sold or liquidated, and trademark rights sold to Thomson SA in 1988.
- Successors: General Electric; RCA (owned by Talisman Brands); RCA Records (owned by Sony Music Entertainment); NBC (owned by Comcast)
- Headquarters: New York City, New York, US
- Key people: Owen D. Young (first board chairman); David Sarnoff (first general manager and third president)
- Products: Radios; Vacuum tubes Phonograph records Electric phonograph Audio accessories RCA Photophone; Televisions; CED Videodisc; TV station equipment: Studio cameras Videotape machines Film chains TV transmitters TV broadcast antennas Satellites; Video game consoles
- Parent: GE (1919–1932, 1986–1987); Technicolor SA (Note: Until 2010 known as Thomson SA) (trademark rights only, 1987–2022); Talisman Brands d.b.a Established Inc. (trademark, since 2022)
- Divisions: RCA Records; National Broadcasting Company, Inc. RCA/Columbia Pictures Home Video; RCA Services; RCA International Division
- Website: rca.com

Evolution of Comcast
- 1909: Independent Moving Pictures was founded by Carl Laemmle as the predecessor to Universal
- 1912: Universal Studios Hollywood was founded after Independent Moving merged with several smaller film studios
- 1915: Universal City, California, was established as the entertainment district for the Universal Studios Lot.
- 1924: MCA Inc. was founded by Jules Stein as a talent agency to book musicians
- 1926: RCA Corporation launched the NBC Radio Network, and by 1939, NBC began broadcasting on television.
- 1934: Decca Records America was established and would later grow to become Universal Music Group
- 1946: William Goetz and Leo Spitz began managing Universal Pictures, after merging International Pictures
- 1952: Decca Records America acquired a controlling stake in Universal Pictures
- 1958: MCA acquired the Universal Studios film lot and later purchased Decca Records America, and Universal Pictures in 1962
- 1963: Comcast was founded as American Cable Systems by Ralph J. Roberts
- 1973: Decca Records America is retired as a brand and renamed to MCA Records
- 1986: General Electric acquired RCA Corp and dissolved the company while retaining ownership of NBC
- 1990: Panasonic acquired a Controlling interest in MCA, but sold it to Seagram within five years after growing costs
- 1998: MCA Records acquired Polygram N.V. from Philips and was renamed to Universal Music Group
- 2000: Seagram Entertainment was sold to Vivendi and merged with StudioCanal to become Vivendi Universal
- 2002: NBC acquired Telemundo while Comcast acquired AT&T Broadband
- 2004: Vivendi Universal was consolidated with General Electric's wholly owned NBC to form NBCUniversal, while Universal Music Group was separated
- 2013: Comcast closed its acquisition of NBCUniversal from General Electric
- 2018: Sky Group was acquired from 21st Century Fox after a bidding war
- 2020: Peacock was launched
- 2026: Majority of NBCU's cable networks were spun off into another company named Versant, while Comcast later announced it would spin-off NBCUniversal and Sky into a separate company

RCA Corporation, founded as the Radio Corporation of America, was a major American electronics company in existence from 1919 to 1987. Initially, RCA was a patent trust owned by a partnership of General Electric (GE), Westinghouse, AT&T Corporation and United Fruit Company. It became an independent company in 1932 after the partners agreed to divest their ownerships in settling an antitrust lawsuit by the United States.

An innovative and progressive company, RCA was the dominant electronics and communications firm in the United States for over five decades. In the early 1920s, RCA was at the forefront of the mushrooming radio industry, both as a major manufacturer of radio receivers and as the exclusive manufacturer of the first superheterodyne receiver. In 1926, the company founded the National Broadcasting Company (NBC), the first nationwide radio network. During the 1920s and 1930s RCA also pioneered the introduction and development of broadcast television—both black and white and especially color television. Throughout most of its existence, RCA was closely identified with the leadership of David Sarnoff. He became general manager at the company's founding, served as president from 1930 to 1965, and remained active as chairman of the board until the end of 1969.

Until the 1970s, RCA maintained a seemingly impregnable stature as corporate America's leading name in technology, innovation, and home entertainment. However, the company's performance began to weaken as it expanded beyond its original focus—developing and marketing consumer electronics and communications in the US—towards the larger goal of operating as a diversified multinational conglomerate. The company also faced increasing domestic competition from international electronics firms such as Sony, Philips, Matsushita and Mitsubishi. RCA suffered enormous financial losses attempting to enter the mainframe computer industry, and in other failed projects including the CED videodisc system.

By the mid 1980s, RCA was rebounding but the company was never able to regain its former eminence. In 1986, RCA was reacquired by General Electric during the Jack Welch era at GE. Welch sold or liquidated most of RCA's assets, retaining only NBC and some government services units. Today, RCA exists as a brand name only; the various RCA trademarks are currently owned by Sony Music Entertainment and Talisman Brands (established.), which in turn license the RCA brand name and trademarks for various products to several other companies, including Voxx International, Curtis International, AVC Multimedia, TCL Corporation, and Express LUCK International.

== Establishment by General Electric ==
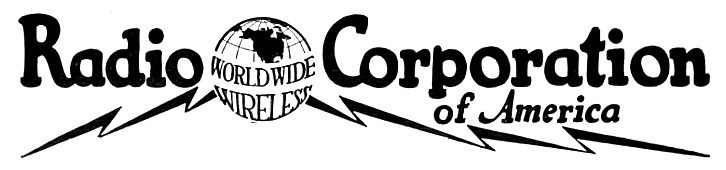
Company logo in 1921 stressed its leadership in international communication.

RCA originated as a reorganization of the Marconi Wireless Telegraph Company of America, commonly called "American Marconi". In 1897, the Wireless Telegraph and Signal Company, Limited, was founded in London to promote the radio—then known as "wireless telegraphy"—inventions of Guglielmo Marconi. As part of worldwide expansion, American Marconi was organized as a subsidiary in 1899, holding the rights to Marconi patents in the United States and Cuba. In 1912, American Marconi took control of the assets of the bankrupt United Wireless Telegraph Company, and from that point forward, was the dominant radio communications company in the United States.

When the United States entered World War I in April 1917, the federal government took control of most civilian radio stations to use them for the war effort. Although the government planned to restore civilian ownership of the radio stations once the war ended, many United States Navy officials hoped to retain a monopoly on radio communication even after the war. Contrary to instructions it had received, the Navy began purchasing large numbers of radio stations. When the war ended, Congress rejected the Navy's efforts to have peacetime control of the radio industry and instructed that the Navy return the stations to the original owners.

Due to national security considerations, the Navy was particularly concerned about returning high-powered international stations to American Marconi, since the majority of its stock was in foreign hands, and the British already largely controlled the international undersea telegraph cables. This concern was increased by the announcement in late 1918 of the formation of the Pan-American Wireless Telegraph and Telephone Company, a joint venture between American Marconi and the Federal Telegraph Company, with plans to set up service between the United States and South America.

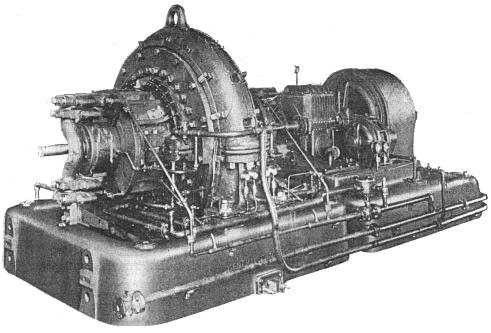
Alexanderson 200-kW motor alternator transmitter installed at the U.S. Navy's New Brunswick, New Jersey station

The Navy had installed a high-powered Alexanderson alternator, built by General Electric (GE), at the American Marconi transmitter site in New Brunswick, New Jersey. It proved to be superior for transatlantic transmissions to the spark-gap transmitters that had been traditionally used by the Marconi companies. Marconi officials were so impressed by the capabilities of the Alexanderson alternators that they began making preparations to adopt them as their standard transmitters for international communication. A tentative plan made with General Electric proposed that over a two-year period the Marconi companies would purchase most of GE's alternator production. However, the U.S. Navy objected to the plan, fearing British domination in international radio communications and the national security concerns this raised.

The Navy, claiming support from U.S. President Woodrow Wilson, looked for an alternative that would result in an "all-American" company taking over the American Marconi assets. In April 1919, two naval officers, Admiral H. G. Bullard and Commander S. C. Hooper, met with GE president Owen D. Young, and requested a suspension of the pending alternator sales to the Marconi companies. This would leave General Electric without a buyer for its transmitters, so the officers proposed that GE purchase American Marconi, and use the assets to form its own radio communications subsidiary. Young consented to this proposal, which, effective November 20, 1919, transformed American Marconi into the Radio Corporation of America. The decision to form the new company was promoted as a patriotic gesture. The corporate officers were required to be citizens of the United States, with a majority of the company stock to be held by U.S. citizens.

Upon its founding, RCA was the largest radio communications firm in the United States. Most of the former American Marconi staff continued to work for RCA. Owen Young became the chairman of the board of the new company. Former American Marconi vice president and general manager E. J. Nally become RCA's first president. Nally was succeeded by Major General James G. Harbord, who served from 1922 until January 3, 1930, when Harbord replaced Owen Young as chairman of the board. David Sarnoff, who was RCA's founding general manager, became its third president on the same day. RCA worked closely with the federal government and felt it deserved to maintain its predominant role in U.S. radio communications. At the company's recommendation, President Wilson appointed Rear Admiral Bullard "to attend the stockholders' and director's meetings... in order that he may present and discuss informally the Government's views and interests".

The radio industry had been making technical advances, particularly in the area of vacuum tube technology and GE needed access to additional patents before its new subsidiary could be fully competitive. During this time American Marconi had been steadily falling behind others in the industry. The two companies then proceeded to negotiate a series of mutually beneficial cross-licensing agreements between themselves and various other companies in the industry. On July 1, 1920, the American Telephone & Telegraph Company (AT&T), agreed to purchase 500,000 shares of RCA—although it divested these shares in early 1923. The United Fruit Company held a small portfolio of radio patents, and signed two agreements in 1921. GE's traditional electric company rival, the Westinghouse Electric & Manufacturing Corporation, had also purchased rights to some critical patents, including one for heterodyne receiving originally issued to Reginald Fessenden, plus regenerative circuit and superheterodyne receiver patents issued to Edwin Armstrong. Westinghouse used this position to negotiate a cross-licensing agreement, effective July 1, 1921, that included a concession that 40% of RCA's equipment purchases would be from Westinghouse. Following these transactions, GE owned 30.1% of RCA's stock, Westinghouse 20.6%, AT&T 10.3%, and United Fruit 4.1%, with the remaining 34.9% owned by individual shareholders.

In 1930, RCA agreed to occupy the yet-to-be-constructed landmark skyscraper of the Rockefeller Center complex, 30 Rockefeller Plaza, which in 1933 became known as the RCA Building (renamed the GE Building in 1988 and currently known as the Comcast Building after Comcast acquired NBC). This lease was critical for enabling the massive project to proceed as a commercially viable venture—David Rockefeller cited RCA's action as being responsible for "the salvation of the project".

== Radio development ==
=== International and marine communication ===
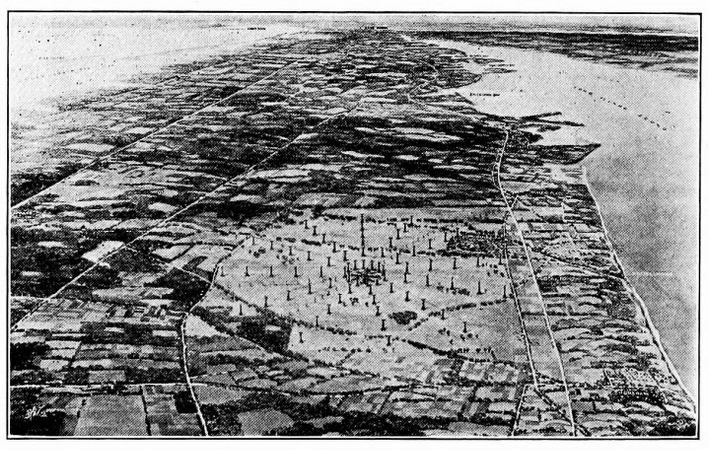
Illustration of how a fully built RCA Radio Central facility at Rocky Point, Long Island, New York would have appeared. Only two of the twelve "antenna spokes" were actually built.

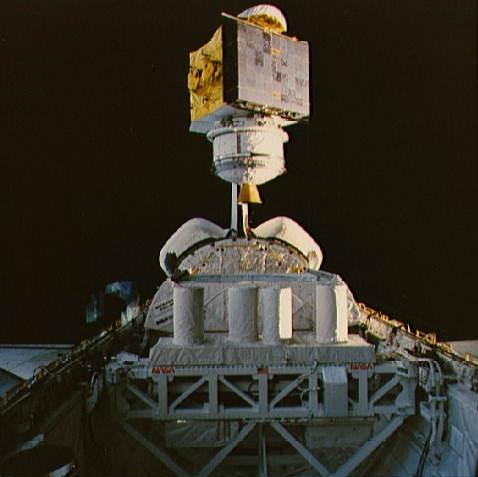
RCA Satcom K1 geostationary communications satellite deployed from Space Shuttle Columbia in 1986

RCA's primary business objectives at its founding were to provide equipment and services for seagoing vessels, and "worldwide wireless" communication in competition with existing international undersea telegraph cables. To provide the international service, the company soon undertook a massive project to build a "Radio Central" communications hub at Rocky Point, Long Island, New York, designed to achieve "the realization of the vision of communication engineers to transmit messages to all points of the world from a single centrally located source". Construction began in July 1920, and the site was dedicated on November 5, 1921, after two of the proposed twelve antenna spokes had been completed, and two of the 200-kilowatt alternators installed. The debut transmissions received replies from stations in 17 countries.

Although the initial installation would remain in operation, the additional antenna spokes and alternator installations would not be completed, due to a major discovery about radio signal propagation. While investigating transmitter "harmonics" – unwanted additional radio signals produced at higher frequencies than a station's normal transmission frequency – Westinghouse's Frank Conrad unexpectedly found that in some cases the harmonics could be heard farther than the primary signal, something previously thought impossible, as high-frequency shortwave signals, which had poor groundwave coverage, were thought to have a very limited transmission range. In 1924, Conrad demonstrated to Sarnoff that a low-powered shortwave station in East Pittsburgh, Pennsylvania could be readily received in London by a simple receiver using a curtain rod as an antenna, matching, at a small fraction of the cost, the performance of the massive alternator transmitters. In 1926, Harold H. Beverage further reported that a shortwave signal, transmitted on a 15-meter wavelength (approximately 20 MHz), was received in South America more readily during the daytime than the 200-kilowatt alternator transmissions.

The Alexanderson alternators, control of which had led to RCA's formation, were now considered obsolete, and international radio communication would be primarily conducted using vacuum tube transmitters operating on shortwave bands. RCA would continue to operate international telecommunications services for the remainder of its existence, through its subsidiary RCA Communications, Inc., and later the RCA Global Communications Company. In 1975, the company formed RCA American Communications, which operated its Satcom series of geostationary communications satellites. International shortwave links were in turn largely supplanted by communications satellites, especially for distributing network radio and television programming.

At the time RCA was founded in 1919, all radio and telegraphic communication between China and the US, including official messages, were sent through either German radio or British cable links. The U.S. Navy lobbied RCA to seek a concession for a radio link to China, however the company was reluctant because its other concessions were already operating at a loss. This link began operation in 1928. The Mackay Radio and Telegraph Company of California signed a similar agreement with China in 1932. RCA claimed this was breach of contract on the grounds that its 1928 agreement had given it exclusive rights. The dispute went to arbitration, and in 1935 a decision, issued in Radio Corporation of America v China, concluded the Mackay concession was valid, because the earlier RCA concession had not granted exclusive rights.

==== Patents and licensing ====
The formation of RCA was closely tied to the control and licensing of key wireless patents. Agreements among General Electric, Westinghouse, AT&T, and RCA created a large patent pool covering many radio technologies, including vacuum tubes and receiver circuits. These arrangements influenced which companies could manufacture radio equipment and played an important role in shaping the early radio industry.

=== Broadcasting ===
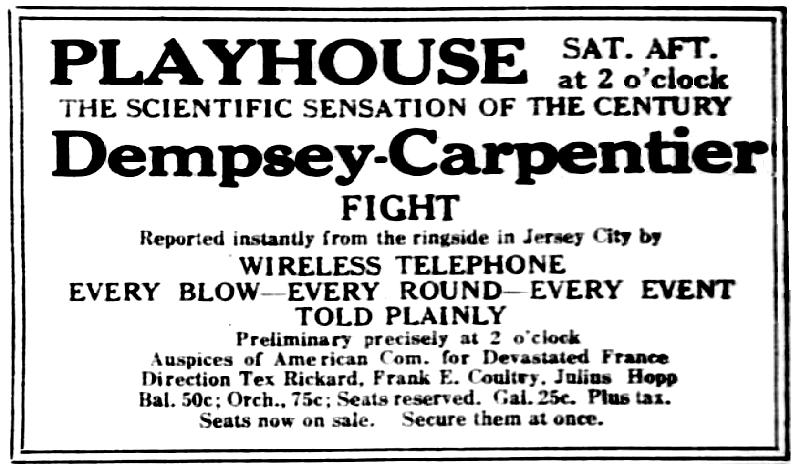
Advertisement promoting theater attendance to hear the ringside commentary broadcast by RCA's temporary station, WJY (1921)

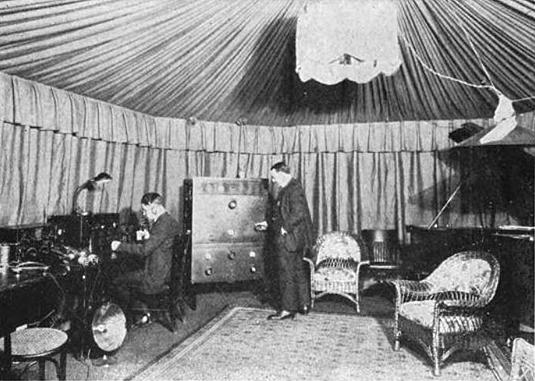
Studio of RCA's first broadcasting station, the short-lived WDY, located at its plant in Roselle Park, New Jersey (1922)

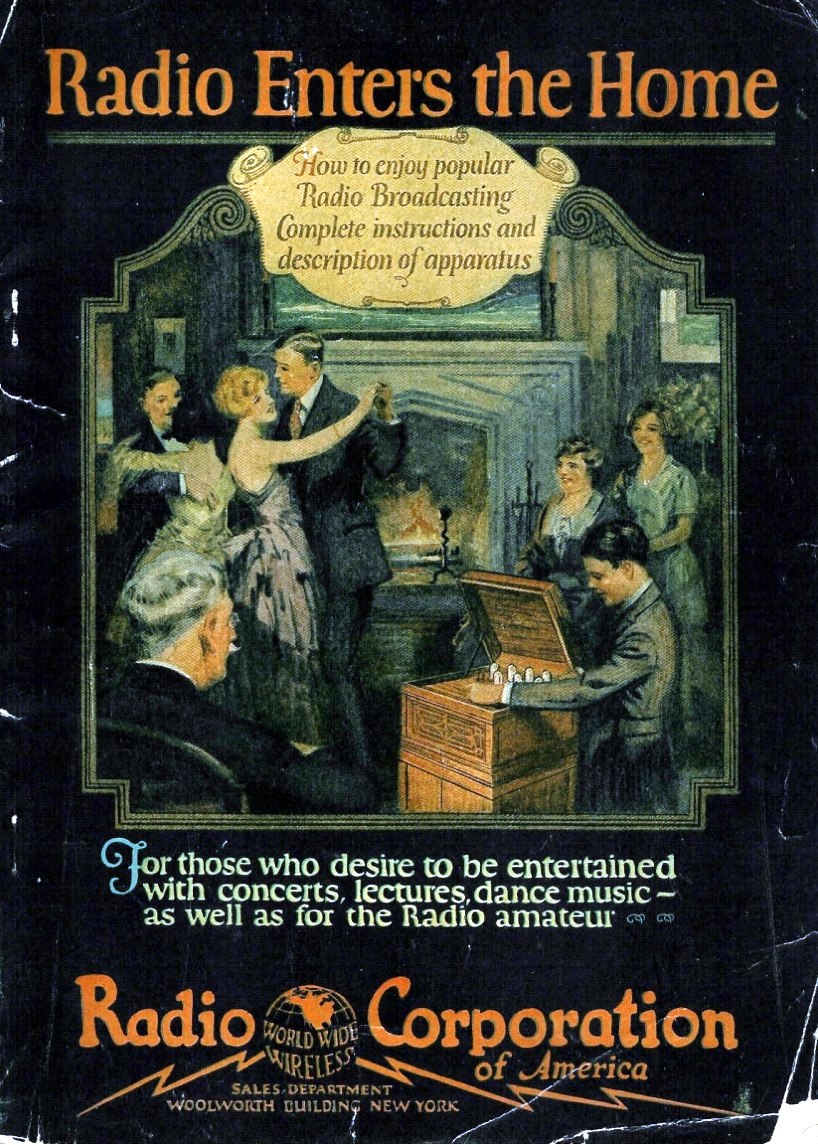
The June 1, 1922, cover of RCA's equipment catalog showcased the emerging home market.

The introduction of organized radio broadcasting in the early 1920s resulted in a dramatic reorientation and expansion of RCA's business activities. The development of vacuum tube radio transmitters made audio transmissions practical, in contrast with the earlier transmitters which were limited to sending the dits-and-dahs of Morse code. Since at least 1916, when he was still at American Marconi, David Sarnoff had proposed establishing broadcasting stations, but his memos to management promoting the idea for sales of a "Radio Music Box" had not been followed up at the time.

A small number of broadcasting stations began operating, and soon interest in the innovation was spreading nationwide. In the summer of 1921, a Madison Square Garden employee, Julius Hopp, devised a plan to raise charitable funds by broadcasting, from ringside, the July 2, 1921 Dempsey-Carpentier heavyweight championship fight to be held in Jersey City, New Jersey. Hopp recruited theaters and halls as listening locations that would charge admission fees to be used as charitable donations. He also contacted RCA's J. Andrew White, the acting president of the National Amateur Wireless Association (NAWA), an organization originally formed by American Marconi which had been inherited by RCA. White agreed to recruit the NAWA membership for volunteers to provide assistance at the listening sites, and also enlisted David Sarnoff for financial and technical support. RCA was authorized to set up a temporary longwave radio station, located in Hoboken a short distance from the match site, and operating under the call letters WJY. For the broadcast White and Sarnoff telephoned commentary from ringside, which was typed up and then read over the air by J. Owen Smith. The demonstration was a technical success, with a claimed audience of 300,000 listeners throughout the northeast.

RCA quickly moved to expand its broadcasting activities. In the fall of 1921, it set up its first full-time broadcasting station, WDY, at the Roselle Park, New Jersey company plant. By 1923, RCA was operating three stations: WJZ (now WABC) and WJY in New York City, and WRC (now WTEM) in Washington, D.C. A restriction imposed by AT&T's interpretation of the patent cross-licensing agreements required that the RCA stations remain commercial free, and they were financed by profits from radio equipment sales.

=== National Broadcasting Company ===
Beginning in 1922, AT&T became heavily involved in radio broadcasting, and soon was the new industry's most important participant. From the beginning, AT&T's policy was to finance stations by commercial sponsorship of the programs. The company also created the first radio network, centered on its New York City station WEAF (now WFAN), using its long-distance telephone lines to interconnect stations. This allowed them to economize by having multiple stations carry the same program.

RCA and its partners soon faced an economic crisis, as the costs of providing programming threatened to exceed the funds available from equipment profits. In 1926, AT&T transferred its broadcasting related activities into a new subsidiary, the Broadcasting Company of America (BCA), with its primary assets consisting of broadcasting stations WEAF in New York City and WCAP in Washington, D.C., plus its network operations. Two months later, AT&T unexpectedly decided to exit the radio broadcasting field, and RCA purchased the BCA subsidiary for $1,000,000. These assets formed the basis for the creation of the National Broadcasting Company (NBC), with ownership divided between RCA (50%), General Electric (30%), and Westinghouse (20%) until 1930, when RCA assumed 100% ownership. This purchase also included the right to begin commercial operations. NBC formed two radio networks that eventually expanded nationwide: the NBC-Red Network, with flagship station WEAF, and NBC-Blue, centered on WJZ. Although NBC was originally promoted as expecting to just break even economically, it soon became extremely profitable, which would be an important factor in helping RCA survive the economic pressures of the Great Depression that began in late 1929.

Concerned that NBC's control of two national radio networks gave it too much power over the industry, in 1941 the Federal Communications Commission (FCC) issued an industry review, Report on Chain Broadcasting, which included a rule designed to force NBC to divest one of them. This order was upheld by the U.S. Supreme Court, and on October 12, 1943, the NBC-Blue network was sold to candy magnate Edward J. Noble for $8,000,000, and renamed "The Blue Network, Inc." In 1946 the name was changed to the American Broadcasting Company (ABC). The "Red" network retained the NBC name and remained under RCA ownership until 1986.

For two decades the NBC radio network's roster of stars provided ratings consistently surpassing those of its main competitor, the Columbia Broadcasting System (CBS), but in 1948, as the transition from radio to television was beginning, NBC's leadership came under attack due to what became known as the "Paley raids", named after the president of CBS, William S. Paley. After World War II the tax rate for annual incomes above $70,000 was 77%, while capital gains were taxed at 25%. Paley worked out an accounting technique whereby individual performers could set up corporations that allowed their earnings to be taxed at the significantly lower rate. Instead of NBC responding with a similar package, Sarnoff decided that this accounting method was legally and ethically wrong. NBC's performers did not agree, and most of the top stars, including Amos and Andy, Jack Benny, Red Skelton, Edgar Bergen, Burns and Allen, Ed Wynn, Fred Waring, Al Jolson, Groucho Marx and Frank Sinatra moved from NBC to CBS. As a result, CBS boasted of having sixteen of the twenty top-rated programs in 1949. The consequences would carry over to television, where CBS maintained its newfound dominance for decades. Paley had personally worked to woo the performers, while Sarnoff professed his indifference to the defections, stating at an annual meeting that "Leadership built over the years on a foundation of solid service cannot be snatched overnight by buying a few high-priced comedians. Leadership is not a laughing matter."

=== Radio receivers ===
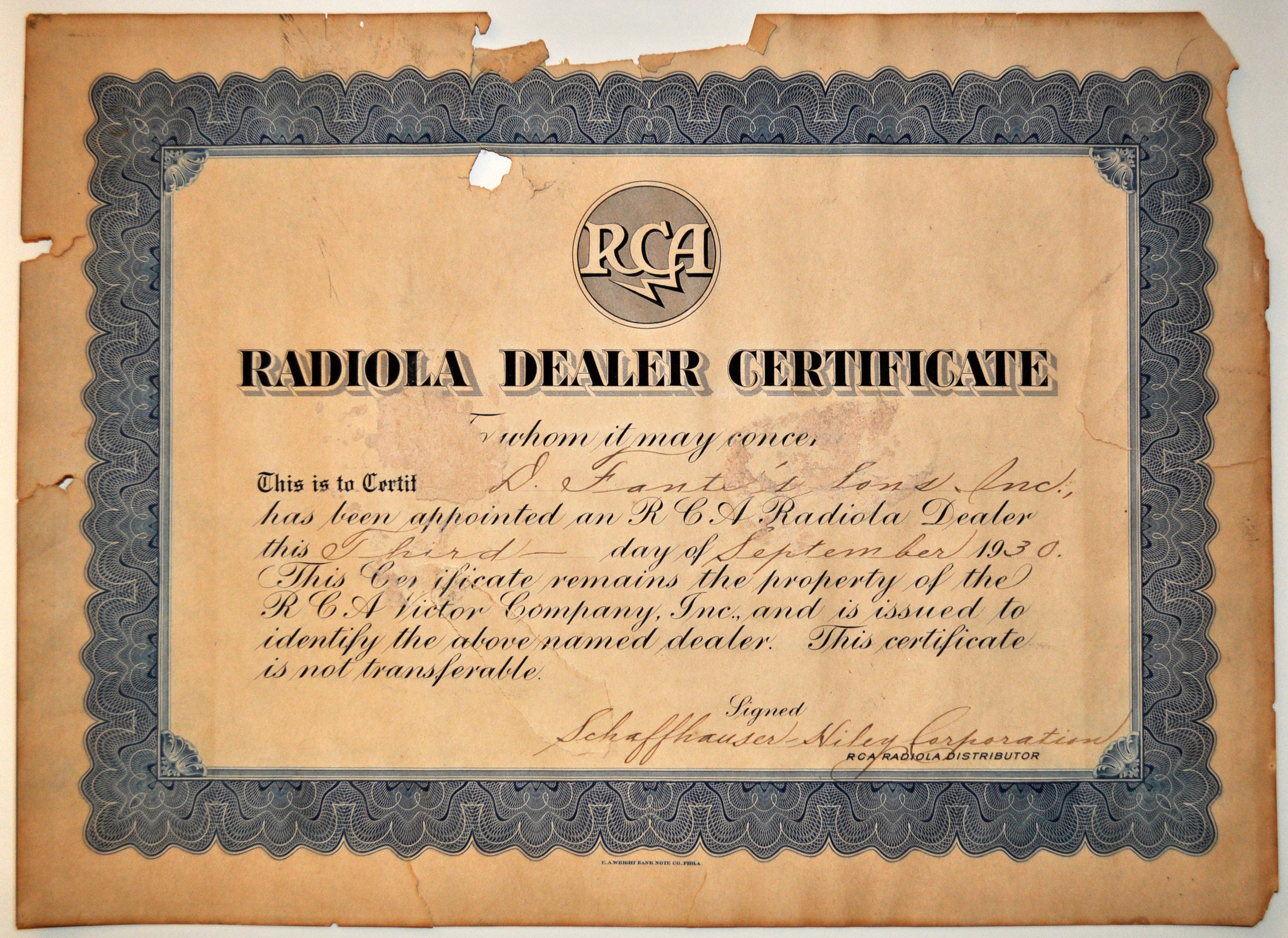
RCA Radiola Dealer Certificate issued to D. Fante's Sons Inc., Philadelphia PA (RCA Victor Company 03 Sept 1930)

Following its founding, RCA acted as the sales agent for a small line of Westinghouse and GE branded receivers and parts used by home constructors, originally for a limited market of amateur radio enthusiasts. By 1922, the rise of broadcasting had dramatically increased the demand for radio equipment by the general public, and this development was reflected in the title of RCA's June 1, 1922, catalog, "Radio Enters the Home". RCA began selling receivers under the "Radiola" name, marketing equipment produced by GE and Westinghouse under the production agreement that allocated a 60%–40% ratio in output between the two companies. Although the patent cross-licensing agreements had been intended to give the participants domination of equipment sales, the tremendous growth of the market led to fierce competition, and in 1925 RCA fell behind Atwater Kent as the leader in receiver sales. RCA was particularly hamstrung by the need to coordinate its sales within the limits of the GE/Westinghouse production quotas, and often had difficulty keeping up with industry trends. However, the company made a key advance in early 1924 when it began selling the first superheterodyne receivers, whose high level of performance increased the brand's reputation and popularity. RCA was the exclusive manufacturer of superheterodyne radio sets until 1930. All RCA receivers were battery powered until late 1927 when plug-in AC sets were introduced, providing another boost in sales.

== Vacuum tubes ==
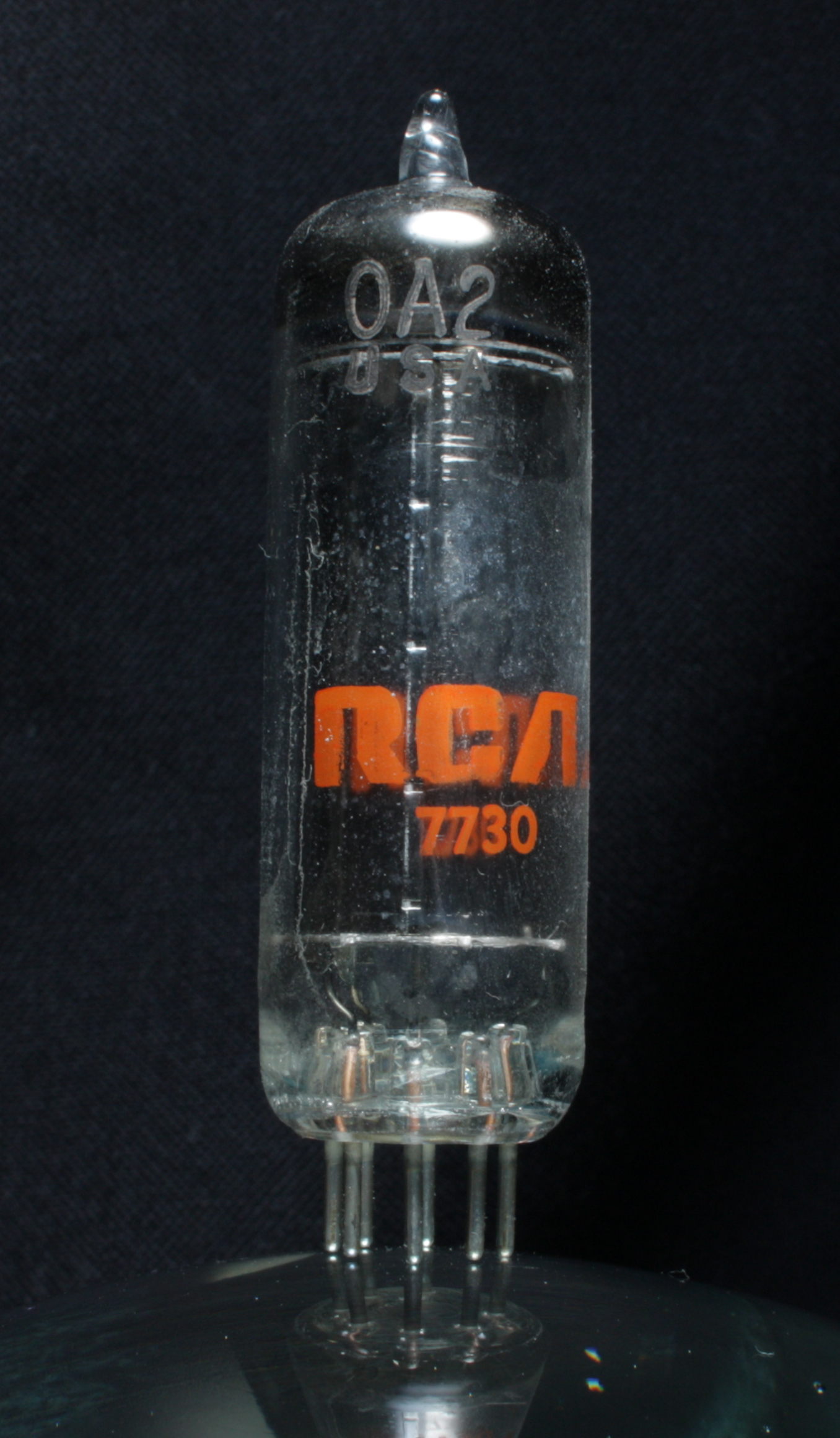
RCA voltage regulator vacuum tube

RCA inherited American Marconi's status as a major producer of vacuum tubes, which were branded Radiotron in the United States. Especially after the rise of broadcasting, they were a major profit source for the company. RCA's strong patent position meant that the company effectively set the selling prices for vacuum tubes in the U.S., which were significantly higher than in Europe, where Lee de Forest had allowed a key patent to lapse.

The company began work on a secret project for the U.S. Navy called Madame X in September 1942. The Bloomington, Indiana, plant was one of the first of five RCA plants to produce Madame X vacuum tubes, which included a proximity fuse used to electronically detonate its payload when it was in range of its target, as opposed to relying on a direct hit. James V. Forrestal, former secretary of the Navy said, "The proximity fuse had helped blaze the trail to Japan. Without the protection this ingenious device has given the surface ships of the fleet, our westward push could not have been so swift and the cost in men and ships would have been immeasurably greater."

RCA was responsible for creating a series of innovative products, ranging from octal base metal tubes co-developed with General Electric before World War II, to greatly miniaturized Nuvistor tubes, used in the tuners of the New Vista series of television receivers. The Nuvistors were a last major vacuum tube innovation, along with General Electric's Compactron, and were meant to compete with the newly introduced transistor. By 1975, RCA had completely switched from tubes to solid-state devices in their television sets, except for the cathode ray tube (CRT) picture tube itself.

== Phonographs and records ==
The rapid rise of radio broadcasting during the early 1920s, which provided unlimited free entertainment in the home, had a detrimental effect on the American phonograph record industry. The Victor Talking Machine Company in Camden, New Jersey, was then the world's largest manufacturer of phonographs and records, including its popular line of "Victrola" console and tabletop phonographs. In January 1929, RCA purchased the Victor Talking Machine Company; this acquisition became known as the RCA Victor Division of the Radio Corporation of America, and included ownership of Victor's Japanese subsidiary, the Victor Company of Japan (JVC), formed in 1927 and controlling interest in The Gramophone Company Ltd. (later EMI Records) in England.

RCA's acquisition of the Victor company included the rights to the iconic Nipper/"His Master's Voice" trademark across the Western Hemisphere. RCA Victor popularized combined radio receiver-phonographs, and also created RCA Photophone, a movie sound-on-film system that competed with William Fox's sound-on-film Movietone and Warner Bros.' sound-on-disc Vitaphone. Although early announcements of the merger between RCA and Victor stressed that the two firms were linking on equal terms to form a new company, RCA initially had little interest in the phonograph record business. RCA's management was interested essentially in Victor's superior sales capabilities through the record company's large network of authorized distributors and dealers, as well as the extensive, efficient manufacturing facilities in Camden, New Jersey. Immediately following the purchase of Victor, RCA began planning the manufacture of radio sets and components on Victor's Camden assembly lines, while gradually decreasing the production of Victrolas and records.

Following the Stock market crash of 1929 and subsequent Great Depression, the entire phonograph record industry in America nearly foundered. During the nadir of the record business in the early 1930s, the manufacture of phonographs and records had all but ceased; extant older phonographs were now considered obsolete and most had been relegated to the attic or basement. In 1930, RCA Victor began selling the first all-electric Victrola and in 1931, the company attempted to revitalize moribund record sales with the introduction of 33 1/3 revolutions-per-minute (rpm) long play records, which were a commercial failure during the Great Depression, partly because the Victrolas with two speed turntables required to play them were exorbitantly expensive, and also because the audio performance of the new records was generally poor; the new format used the same groove size as existing 78 rpm records, and it would require the smaller-radius stylus of the later microgroove systems to achieve acceptable slower-speed performance. Additionally, the new long-play records were pressed in a pliable, vinyl-based material called "Victrolac" which wore out rapidly under the weight of heavy magnetic pickups and tonearms then in use.

In 1934, following the debacle of its long-play record, RCA Victor introduced the Duo Jr., an inexpensive, small, basic electric turntable designed to be plugged into radio sets. The Duo Jr. was sold at cost, but was discounted even further with the purchase of a certain number of Victor records. The Duo Jr.'s rock-bottom price and America's slowly improving economy helped to overcome the national apathy to phonographs, and record sales gradually began to recover. Around 1935, RCA began marketing the modern RCA Victor M Special, a polished aluminum portable record player designed by John Vassos that has become an icon of 1930s American industrial design. In 1949, RCA Victor released the first 45 rpm "single" records, as a response to Columbia Records successful introduction of its microgroove 33 1/3 rpm "LP" format in 1948. As RCA Victor adopted Columbia's 33 1/3 rpm LP records in 1950, Columbia then adopted RCA Victor's 45 rpm records.

In 1965, RCA Victor launched the 8-track tape cartridge. For over a decade, sales of 8-tracks made a huge and profitable impact on consumers of recorded music. Sales of the 8-track format began to decline during the late 1970s as consumer preference turned to the compact cassette tape introduced by Philips in 1963. By 1982, 8-track tapes were no longer being stocked by most music retailers and by 1990, the format had vanished completely.

== Motion pictures ==
RCA also made investments in the movie industry, but they performed poorly. In April 1928, RCA Photophone, Inc., was organized by a group of companies including RCA to develop sound-movie technology. In the fall of 1927, RCA had purchased stock in Film Booking Office (FBO), and on October 25, 1928, with the help of Joseph P. Kennedy, the Radio-Keith-Orpheum Corporation (RKO) studio was formed by merging FBO with Keith-Albee-Orpheum Corporation (KAO), a company whose holdings included motion picture theaters. The theaters in which RKO had an interest provided a potential market for the RCA Photophone sound systems. RCA ownership of RKO stock expanded from about one quarter in 1930 to about 61% in 1932. RKO encountered severe financial problems, going into receivership from early 1933 until 1940. RCA sold its holdings in the studio to raise funds for its basic operations.

== Separation from General Electric ==
After years of industry complaints that the cross-licensing agreements between RCA, GE, and Westinghouse had in effect created illegal monopolies, the U.S. Department of Justice brought antitrust charges against the three companies in May 1930. After much negotiation, in 1932 the Justice Department accepted a consent agreement that removed the restrictions established by the cross-licensing agreements, and also provided that RCA would become a fully independent company. As a result, GE and Westinghouse gave up their ownership interests in RCA, while RCA was allowed to keep its factories. To give RCA a chance to establish itself, GE and Westinghouse were required to refrain from competing in the radio business for the next two and one-half years. In 1954, the Justice Department filed a major antitrust lawsuit against RCA, with charges including patent monopolization, illegal cross-licensing with GE, Westinghouse and AT&T and anticompetitive harassment. The 1958 consent decree forced RCA to share its television and radio patents with domestic competitors on a royalty-free basis.

== Television ==
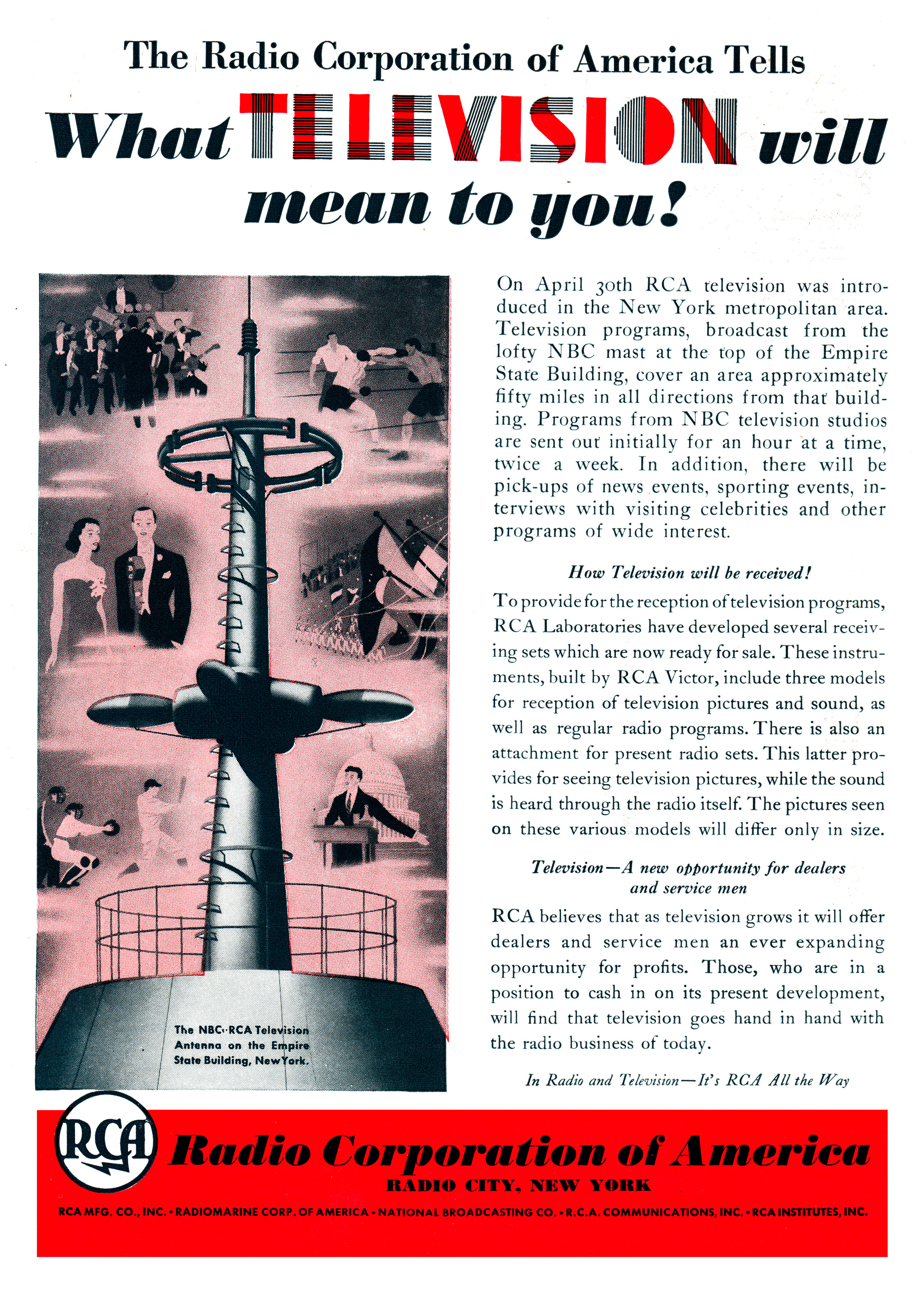
RCA ad for the beginning, in April 1939, of regular experimental television broadcasting by RCA-NBC over New York City station W2XBS (forerunner of today's WNBC/4), for "an hour at a time, twice a week."

RCA began television development in early 1929, after an overly optimistic Vladimir K. Zworykin convinced Sarnoff that a commercial version of his prototype system could be produced in a relatively short time for $100,000. Following what would actually be many years of additional research and millions of dollars, RCA demonstrated an all-electronic black-and-white television system at the 1939 New York World's Fair. RCA began regular experimental television broadcasting from the NBC studios to the New York metropolitan area on April 30, 1939, via station W2XBS, channel 1 (which evolved into WNBC channel 4) from the new Empire State Building transmitter on top of the structure. Around this time, RCA began selling its first television set models, including the TRK-5 and TRK-9, in various New York stores. However, the FCC had not approved the start of commercial television operations, because technical standards had not yet been finalized. Concerned that RCA's broadcasts were an attempt to flood the market with sets that would force it to adopt RCA's current technology, the FCC stepped in to limit its broadcasts.

Following the adoption of National Television System Committee (NTSC) recommended standards, the FCC authorized the start of commercial television broadcasts on July 1, 1941. The entry of the United States into World War II a few months later greatly slowed its deployment, but RCA resumed selling television receivers almost immediately after the war ended in 1945.

In 1950, the FCC adopted a standard for color television that had been promoted by CBS, but the effort soon failed, primarily because the color broadcasts could not be received by existing black-and-white sets. As the result of a major research push, RCA engineers developed a method of "compatible" color transmissions that, through the use of interlacing, simultaneously broadcast color and black-and-white images, which could be picked up by both color and existing black-and-white sets. In 1953, RCA's all-electronic color television technology was adopted as the standard for the United States. At that time, Sarnoff predicted annual color television sales would reach 1.78 million in 1956, but the receivers were expensive and difficult to adjust, and there was initially a lack of color programming, so sales lagged badly and the actual 1956 total would only be 120,000. RCA's ownership of NBC proved to be a major benefit, as that network was instructed to promote its color program offerings; even so, it was not until 1968 that color television sales in the United States surpassed those of black-and-white sets.

While lauding the technical prowess of his RCA engineers who had developed color television, David Sarnoff, in marked contrast to William Paley, president of CBS, did not disguise his dislike for popular television programs. His authorized biography even boasted that "no one has yet caught him in communion with one of the upper dozen or so top-rated programs" and "The popular programs, to put the matter bluntly, have very little appeal for him."

RCA professional video cameras and studio gear, particularly of the TK-40/41 series, became standard equipment at many American television network affiliates, as RCA CT-100 ("RCA Merrill" to dealers) television sets introduced color television to the public.

== Diversification ==
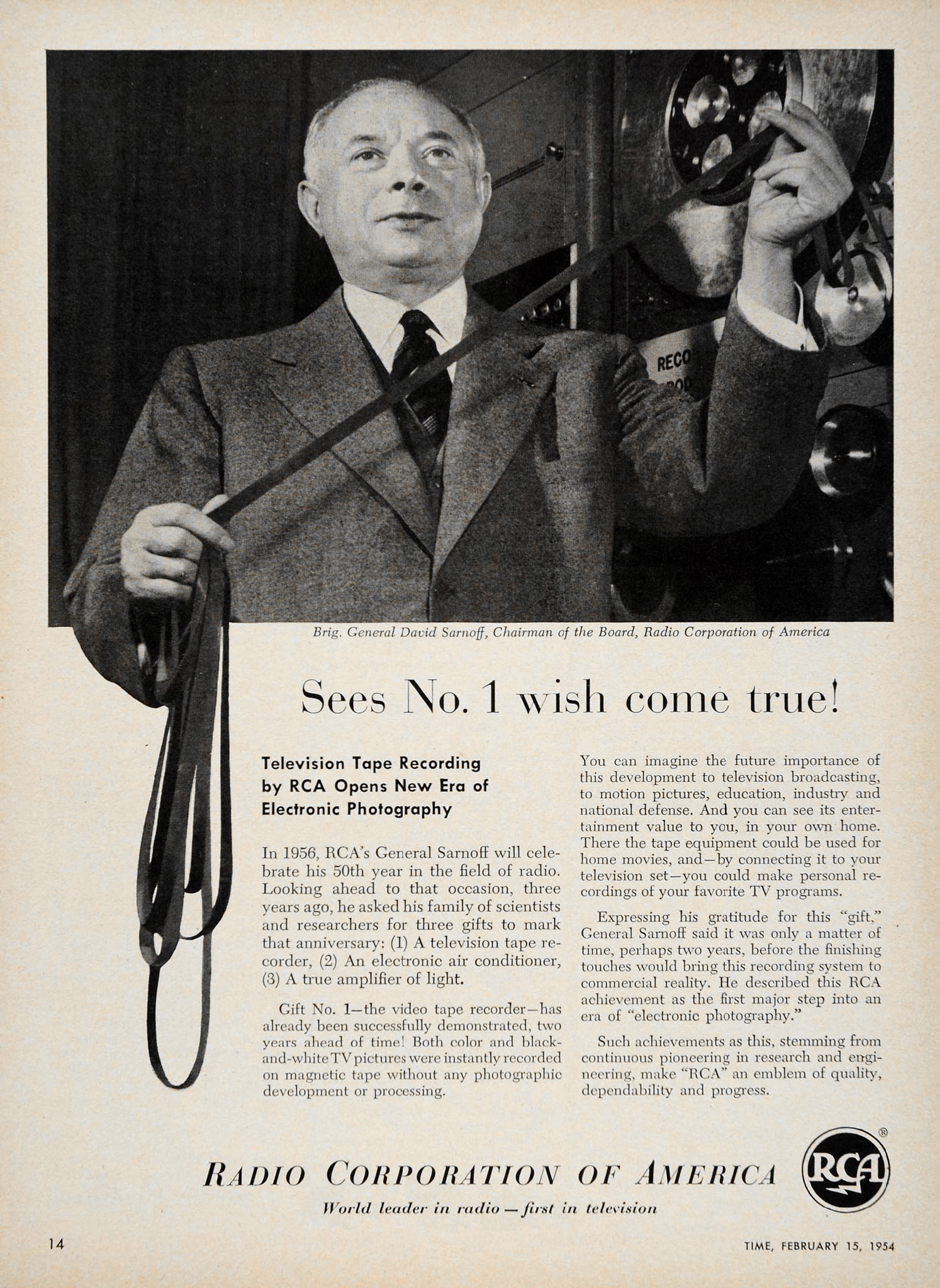
David Sarnoff with the first RCA videotape recorder, 1954

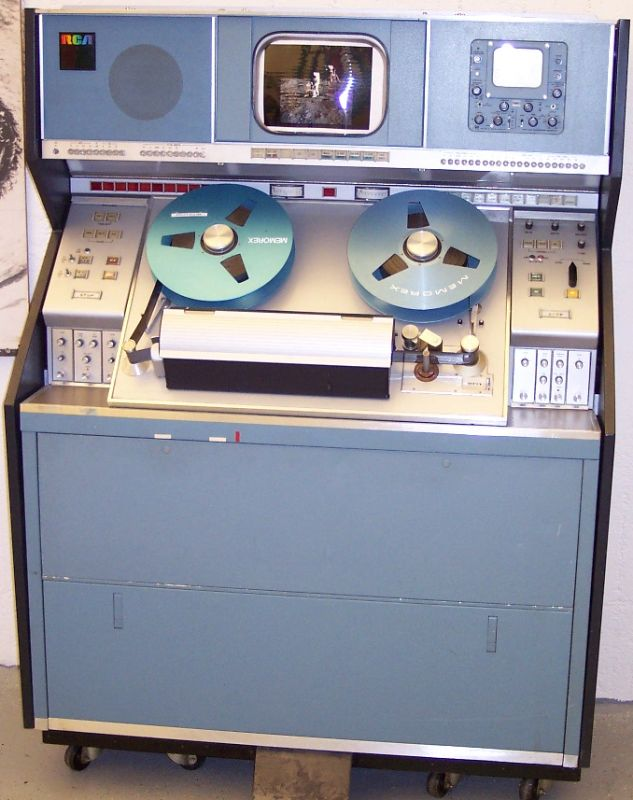
RCA Television Quad head 2-inch color recorder-reproducer used at broadcast studios from the late-1960s to the early 1980s

In 1941, shortly before the United States entered World War II, the cornerstone was laid for a research and development facility in Princeton, New Jersey called RCA Laboratories. Led for many years by Elmer Engstrom, it was used to develop many innovations, including color television, the electron microscope, CMOS-based technology, heterojunction physics, optoelectronic emitting devices, liquid crystal displays (LCDs), videocassette recorders, direct broadcast television, direct broadcast satellite systems and high-definition television.

RCA plants switched to war production shortly after the U.S. entered the war in December 1941. During World War II, RCA was involved in radar and radio development in support of the war effort, and ranked 43rd among United States corporations in the value of wartime military production contracts. One such contract was to outfit the battleship USS Texas with a 400-megahertz pulse radar set, using technology developed by RCA acoustics scientist, Irving Wolff. During and after the war, RCA set up several new divisions for defense, space exploration and other activities. The RCA Service Corporation provided large numbers of staff for the Distant Early Warning (DEW) Line. RCA units won five Army–Navy "E" Awards for Excellence in production. Due to the hostilities between Japan and the United States during World War II, the Victor Company of Japan became an independent company after seceding from RCA Victor in the United States; JVC retained the 'Victor' and "His Master's Voice" trademarks for use in Japan only.

In 1955, RCA sold its Estate brand of large appliance operations to Whirlpool Corporation. As part of this transaction, Whirlpool was given the right to market "RCA Whirlpool" appliances through the mid-1960s.

RCA Graphic Systems Division (GSD) was an early supplier of electronics designed for the printing and publishing industries. It contracted with German company Rudolf Hell to market adaptations of the Digiset photocomposition system as the Videocomp, and a Laser Color Scanner. The Videocomp was supported by a Spectra computer that ran the Page-1 and, later the Page-II and FileComp composition systems. RCA later sold the Videocomp rights to Information International Inc.

== Computers ==
RCA was one of a number of companies in the 1960s that entered the mainframe computer field to challenge the market leader International Business Machines (IBM). Although at this time computers were almost universally used for routine data processing and scientific research, in 1964 Sarnoff, who prided himself as a visionary, predicted that "The computer will become the hub of a vast network of remote data stations and information banks feeding into the machine at a transmission rate of a billion or more bits of information a second ... Eventually, a global communications network handling voice, data and facsimile will instantly link man to machine—or machine to machine—by land, air, underwater, and space circuits. [The computer] will affect man's ways of thinking, his means of education, his relationship to his physical and social environment, and it will alter his ways of living. ... [Before the end of this century, these forces] will coalesce into what unquestionably will become the greatest adventure of the human mind."

RCA marketed a Spectra 70 computer line that was hardware, but not software, compatible with IBM's System/360 series. It also produced the RCA Series, which competed against the IBM System/370. This technology was leased to the English Electric company, which used it for their System 4 series, which were essentially RCA Spectra 70 clones. RCA's TSOS operating system was the first mainframe, demand paging, virtual memory operating system on the market. By 1971, despite a significant investment, RCA had only a 4% market share, and it was estimated that it would cost around $500 million over the next five years to remain competitive with the IBM/370 series. On September 17, 1971, the RCA board of directors announced its decision to close its computer systems division (RCA-CSD), which would be written off as a $490 million company loss. Sperry Rand's UNIVAC division took over the RCA computer division in January 1972. Univac did not want the Spectra computers because they were similar to its own 9000 series; instead, they wanted RCA's computer customer base.

== Later years ==
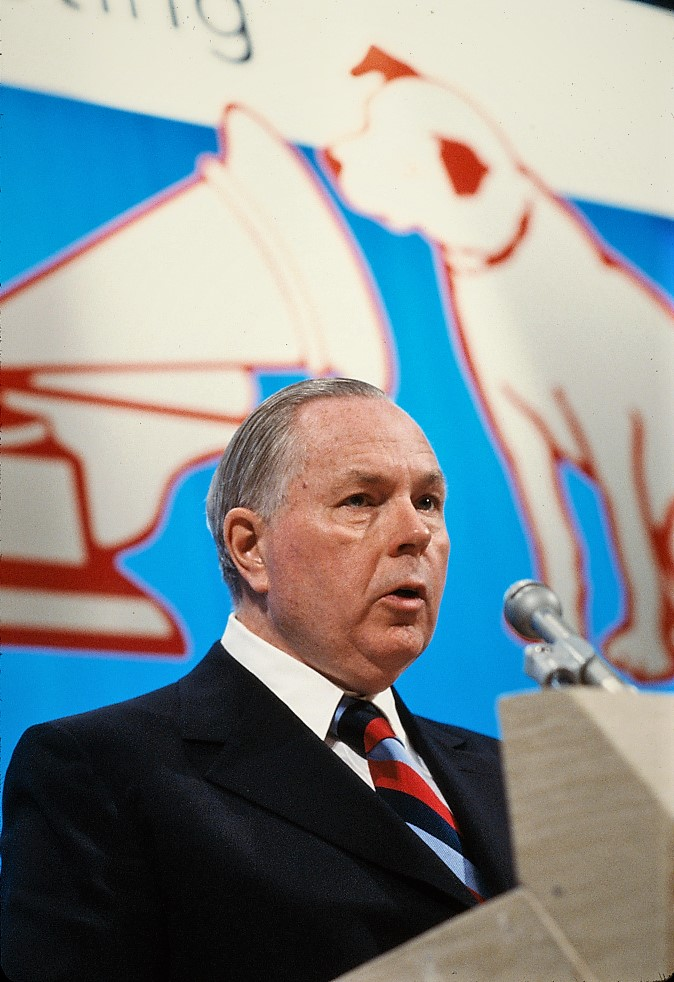
Edgar H. Griffiths, RCA president from 1976 to 1981, at the 1979 Annual Meeting, NYC

On January 1, 1965, Robert Sarnoff succeeded his father as RCA's president, although the elder Sarnoff remained in control as chairman of the board. The younger Sarnoff sought to modernize RCA's image with the introduction in late 1968 of what was then a futuristic-looking new logo (the letters 'RCA' in block, modernized form), replacing the original lightning bolt logo, and the virtual retirement of both the Victor and Nipper/"His Master's Voice" trademarks. The RCA Victor Division was renamed RCA Records; the 'Victor' and 'Victrola' trademarks were no longer used on RCA consumer electronics. 'Victor' was now restricted to the labels and album covers of RCA's regular popular record releases, while the Nipper/"His Master's Voice" trademark was seen only on the album covers of Red Seal records.

In 1969, the company name was officially changed from Radio Corporation of America to the "RCA Corporation", to reflect its broader range of corporate activities and expansion into other countries. At the end of that same year, David Sarnoff, after being incapacitated by a long-term illness, was removed as the company's chairman of the board. He died in December 1971.

RCA's exit from the mainframe computer market in 1971 marked a milestone in its transition from electronics and technology toward Robert Sarnoff's goal to diversify RCA as a multinational business conglomerate. During the late 1960s and 1970s, the company made a wide-ranging series of acquisitions, including Hertz (rental cars), Banquet (frozen foods and TV dinners), Coronet (carpeting), Random House (publishing) and Gibson (greeting cards). However, the company was slipping into financial disarray, with wags calling it "Rugs Chickens & Automobiles" (RCA), to poke fun at its new direction.

During this period, RCA continued to maintain its high standards of engineering excellence in broadcast and satellite communications equipment, but profits generated by the NBC television and radio networks began to decline.

Robert Sarnoff's tenure as RCA president was unsuccessful, marked by falling profits. While out of the country in October 1975, Sarnoff was ousted in a "boardroom coup" led by Anthony Conrad, who became RCA's new president. Conrad resigned less than a year later after he admitted failing to file income tax returns for six years. His successor, Edgar H. Griffiths, proved to be unpopular and retired in early 1981. Griffiths was succeeded by Thornton Bradshaw, who turned out to be the last RCA president.

After the departure of Robert Sarnoff, Griffiths, who considered the demoted "His Master's Voice" trademark a "valuable company asset", restored Nipper as RCA's corporate mascot. On October 31, 1976, RCA formally announced the return of the Nipper trademark to RCA products and advertising. Earlier that year, RCA Records had begun to reinstate Nipper to most record labels in countries and territories where RCA held the rights to the trademark. Once again, Nipper was widely used in RCA newspaper, magazine, and TV advertisements. The trademark also returned to company stationery, sales literature, shipping cartons, store displays, delivery and service vehicles and reappeared on RCA television sets and in 1981, the new CED Videodisc system. Several newspaper articles and TV news reports about Nipper's revival appeared at the time. A multitude of new Nipper promotional items and collectibles also appeared, including T-shirts, caps, neckties, beach towels, cigarette lighters, coin banks, keychains, watches, clocks, coffee mugs, drinking glasses and stuffed toys.

Projects attempting to establish new consumer electronics products during this era failed and lost RCA much money and prestige. An RCA Studio II home video game console, introduced in 1977, was canceled just under two years later due to poor sales. Development of RCA's capacitance electronic (CED) videodisc system began in 1964, and after several years of delays was launched in March 1981. Marketed under the SelectaVision name, the RCA CED videodisc system represented the largest investment RCA made in a single product, even greater than color TV. However, the system was practically obsolete by the time it finally appeared, and never reached the manufacturing volumes needed to bring its price down to the level needed to compete against the newer, recordable and increasingly cheaper videotape technology. In April 1984, after three years of slow sales, RCA abandoned manufacture of the CED players, and ended videodisc production in 1986, after a loss of around $650 million.

Around 1980, RCA corporate strategy reported on moving manufacture of its television receivers to Mexico. In 1981, Columbia Pictures sold its share in the home video division to RCA and outside of North America this division was renamed "RCA/Columbia Pictures International Video (now Sony Pictures Home Entertainment)". The following year, within North America, it was renamed to "RCA/Columbia Pictures Home Video". In 1983, the German media conglomerate Bertelsmann sold 50% of Arista Records to RCA Records; in 1985, RCA and Bertelsmann formed a joint venture, RCA/Ariola International, which took over management of RCA Records. Bertelsmann would fully acquire RCA Records from General Electric after GE absorbed RCA in 1986.

RCA was still profitable in 1983, when it switched manufacturing of its VHS VCRs from Panasonic to Hitachi. In 1984, RCA Broadcast Systems Division moved from the RCA Victor plant in Camden, New Jersey, to the site of the RCA antenna engineering facility in Gibbsboro, New Jersey. On October 3, 1985, RCA announced it was closing the Broadcast Systems Division. In the years that followed, the broadcast product lines developed in Camden were terminated or sold off, and most of the old RCA Victor buildings and factories in Camden were demolished, except for a few of the original Victor buildings that had been declared national historic buildings. For several years, RCA spinoff L-3 Communications Systems East was headquartered in the famous Nipper Building, but has since moved to an adjacent building built by the city for them. The renovated Nipper Building now houses shops and luxury loft apartments. Also in 1985, RCA sold the Hertz car rental company to UAL, Inc.

== Re-acquisition and breakup by General Electric ==
In December 1985, it was announced that General Electric would reacquire its former subsidiary for $6.28 billion in cash, or $66.50 per share of stock. GE's acquisition of RCA was the largest non-oil company merger in history up to that time and was completed on June 9, 1986. Despite initial assurances that the combined forces of GE and RCA would create a technology, manufacturing and entertainment behemoth and RCA would continue to operate mostly autonomously, over the next few years, GE proceeded to sell off most of RCA's assets. It was revealed that GE's main motivation for purchasing RCA was to acquire the NBC Television Network and the corporation's defense related businesses. In 1987, GE disposed of its 50% interest in RCA Records to its German partner Bertelsmann and RCA Records became a division of Bertelsmann Music Group; the NBC Radio Network was sold to Westwood One; RCA Global Communications Inc., a division with roots dating back to RCA's founding in 1919, was acquired by the MCI Communications Corporation.

In 1988, the rights to manufacture consumer electronics products under the RCA and GE brands was acquired by Thomson Consumer Electronics, in exchange for some of Thomson's medical businesses. Also in 1988, its semiconductor business (including the former RCA Solid State unit and Intersil) was bought by Harris Corporation. That same year, the iconic RCA Building, known as "30 Rock" at Rockefeller Center was renamed the GE Building.

In 1991, GE sold its share in RCA/Columbia to Sony Pictures which renamed the unit "Columbia TriStar Home Video" (later further renamed to Columbia TriStar Home Entertainment, now Sony Pictures Home Entertainment).

Sarnoff Labs was put on a five-year plan whereby GE would fund all the labs' activities for the first year, then reduce its support to near zero after the fifth year. This required Sarnoff Labs to change its business model to become an industrial contract research facility. In 1988, it was transferred to SRI International (SRI) as the David Sarnoff Research Center, and subsequently renamed the Sarnoff Corporation. In January 2011, Sarnoff Corporation was fully integrated into SRI.

In 2011, GE sold its controlling interest in NBC, by this time part of the multimedia NBCUniversal venture that included TV and cable, to Comcast, and in 2013, Comcast acquired the remaining interest. After the sale of NBCUniversal, the only former RCA unit which GE retained was Government Services; until its breakup itself in 2024 where it was split into GE Aerospace, GE HealthCare, and GE Vernova, where the Aerospace entity inherited the Government Services unit. Comcast later spun off NBCUniversal's cable channels as Versant in 2026.

In 2022, Thomson's successor company, Technicolor SA, sold the RCA trademarks to licensing firm Talisman Brands, Inc. d/b/a Established Incorporated, stylized as established.

== Legacy ==
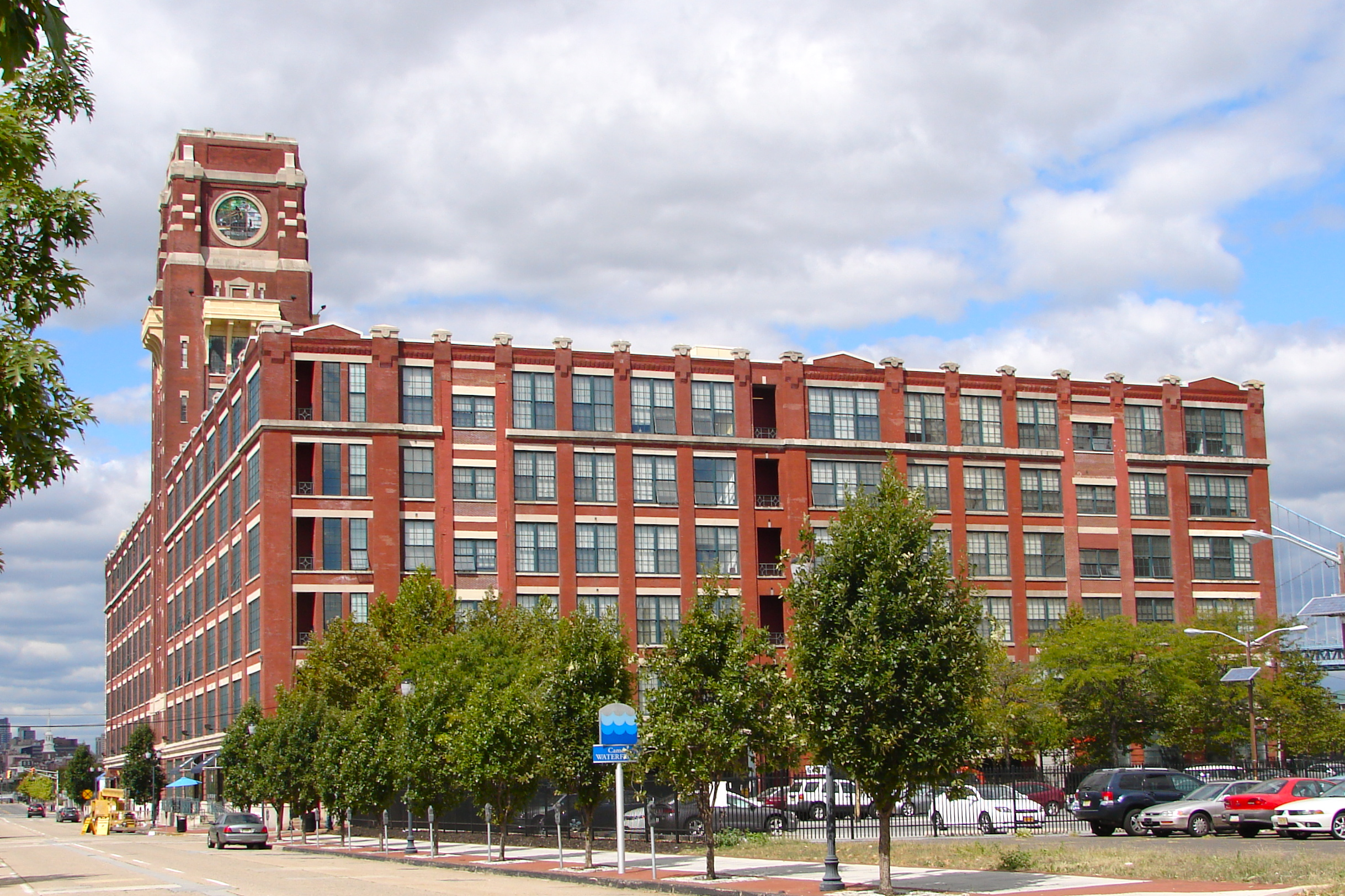
The historic RCA Victor Building 17 is one of a few remaining buildings in Camden, New Jersey, of the dozens that formerly housed the vast Victor Talking Machine Company/RCA Victor manufacturing complex.

RCA antique radios, and early color television receivers such as the RCA Merrill/CT-100, are among the more sought-after collectible radios and televisions, due to their popularity during the golden age of radio and the historic significance of the RCA name, as well as their styling, manufacturing quality and engineering innovations. Most collectable are the pre-war television sets manufactured by RCA beginning in 1939, including the TRK-5, TRK-9 and TRK-12 models.

The RCA Heritage Museum was established at Rowan University in 2012.

The historic RCA Victor Building 17, the "Nipper Building", in Camden, New Jersey, was converted to luxury apartments in 2003.

A type of plug/jack combination used in audio and video cables is still called the RCA connector.

To this day, a variety of consumer electronics including 2-in-1 tablets, televisions and telephones, home appliances and more are sold under the RCA brand name.

RCA Records continues as a flagship label of Sony Music Entertainment.

=== Environmental issues ===
Numerous former RCA manufacturing sites have been reported to be polluted with industrial waste.

- A former RCA facility in Taiwan's northern county of Taoyuan (now Taoyuan City) polluted groundwater with toxic chemicals and led to a high incidence of cancer among former employees. The area was declared a toxic site by the Taiwanese Environmental Protection Agency. GE and Thomson spent millions of dollars for cleanup, removing 10,000 cubic yards (7,600 m^{3}) of soil and installing municipal water treatment facilities for neighboring communities. A spokesman for RCA's current owners denied responsibility, saying a study conducted by the Taiwan government showed no correlation between the illnesses and the company's facilities, which shut down in 1991. On April 17, 2015, RCA lost the case and the Taipei District Court ordered RCA's current owners to compensate its former employees with a total of NT$560 million (approximately US$18.1 million).
- A plant in Lancaster, Pennsylvania, which RCA operated from the late 1940s to June 1986, released more than 250,000 pounds of 1,1,1-trichloroethane pollutants per year from its exhaust stacks. Tests by the United States Environmental Protection Agency (EPA) in the late 1980s and early 1990s, found the groundwater contaminated by trichloroethylene (TCE) and 1,2-dichloroethylene (1,2-DCE). In 1991 and 1992, contaminants were detected in monitoring wells on the east side of the Conestoga River in Lancaster. EPA designated General Electric Company to clean up the area.
- The shallow and deep groundwater aquifers beneath the Intersil Facility in Mountaintop, Pennsylvania, which RCA operated in the 1960s and later sold to Harris Corporation, were found in 1999 to contain elevated levels of volatile organic compounds.
- A site in Burlington, Massachusetts, which RCA used from 1958 to 1994 to make and test military electronics equipment, generated hazardous waste (VOCs, TCE, toluene, ethylbenzene, and xylenes).
- In Barceloneta, Puerto Rico, an RCA-operated plant generated wastes containing chromium, selenium and iron. Four lagoons holding chemical waste drained into the limestone aquifer. Used water from the manufacturing process (process water), containing ferric chloride, was treated onsite to remove contaminants and then was discharged into a sinkhole at the site. The treatment of process water created a sludge that was stored onsite in drying beds and in surface impoundments.

== Photo gallery ==
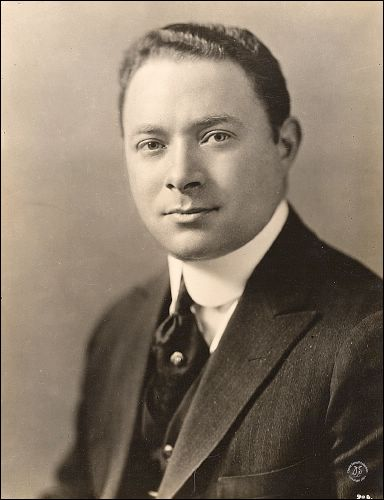
David Sarnoff in 1922

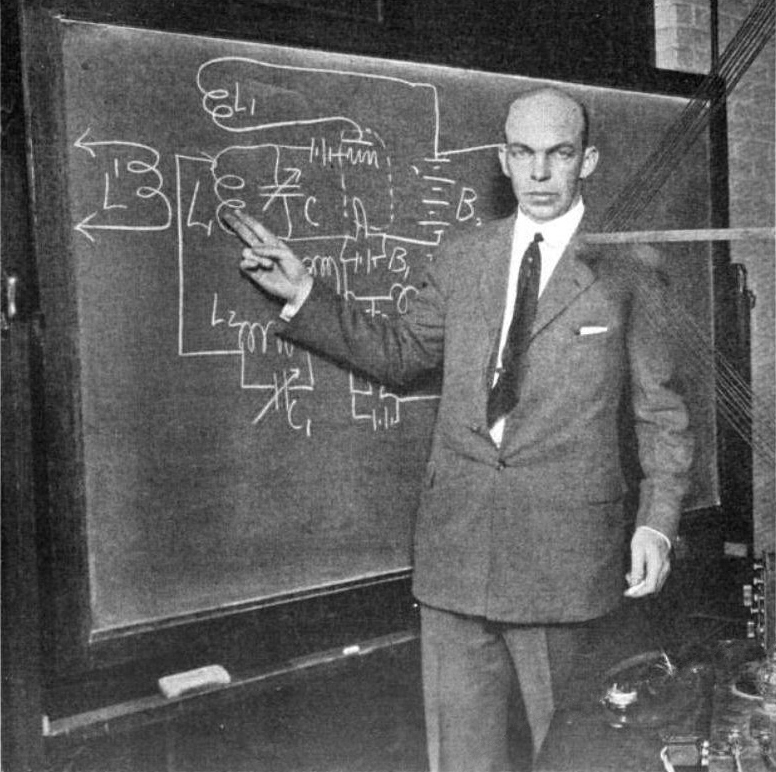
Edwin Armstrong at RCA

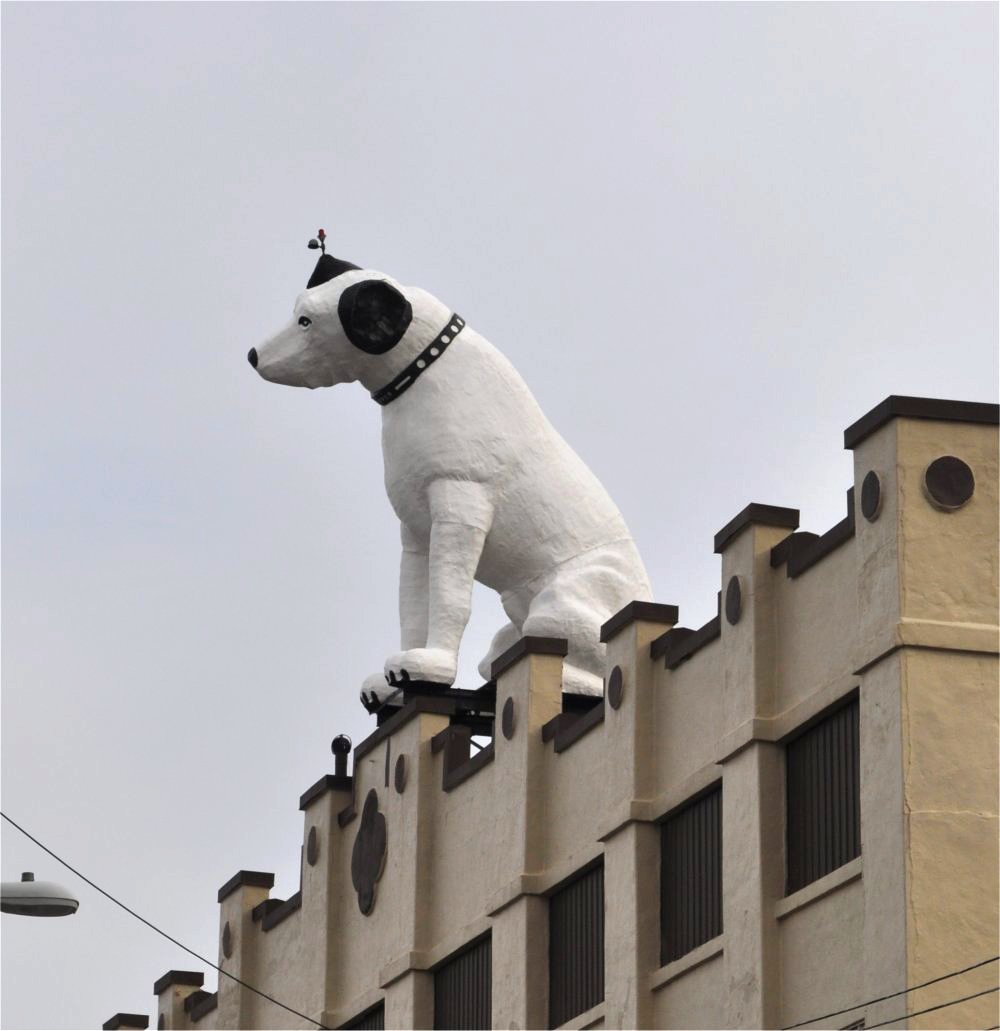
Nipper atop the old RCA distribution building, Broadway, Albany, New York

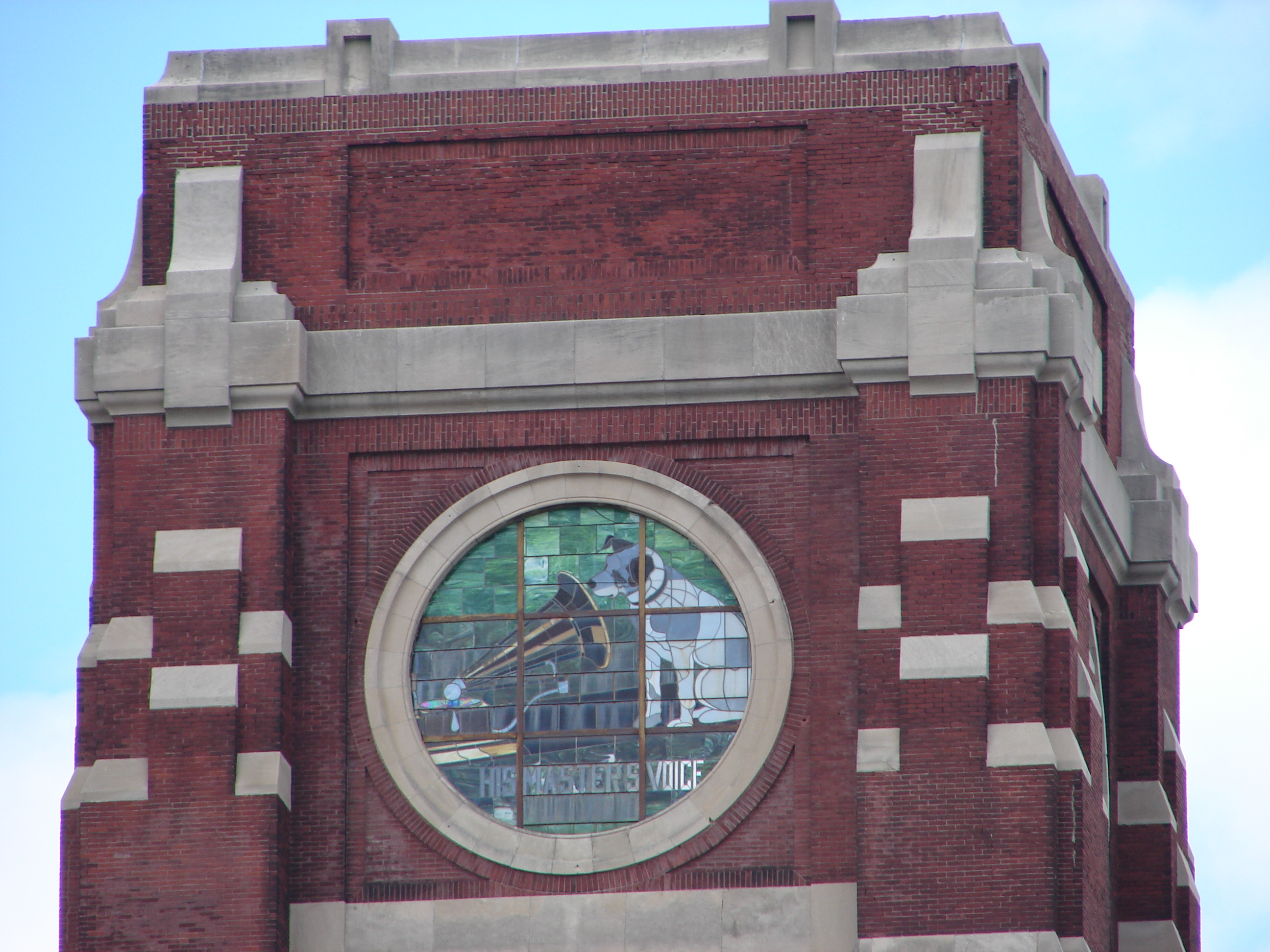
Stained glass Nipper window at RCA Victor Building 17 in Camden NJ.

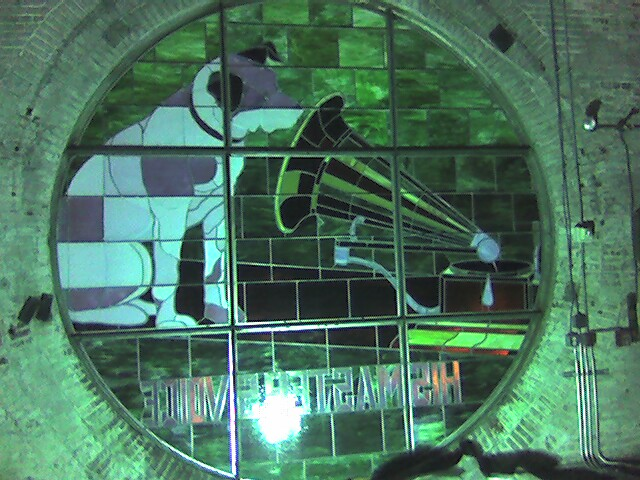
One of 4 Nipper stained glass windows seen from inside the "Nipper Tower" in the old RCA Victor Building 17

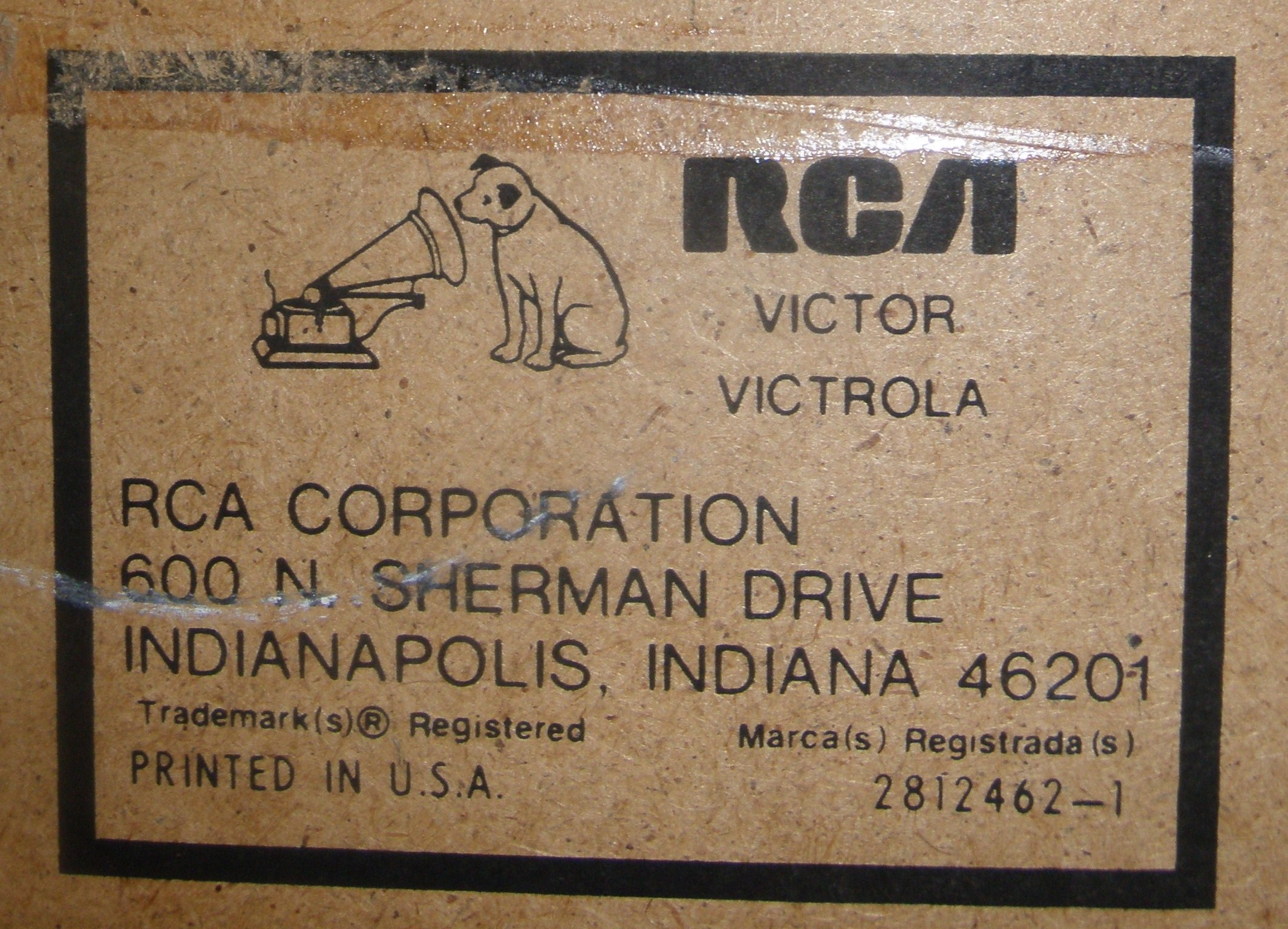
RCA trademarks displayed on the back of Dimensia TV, the 1980s

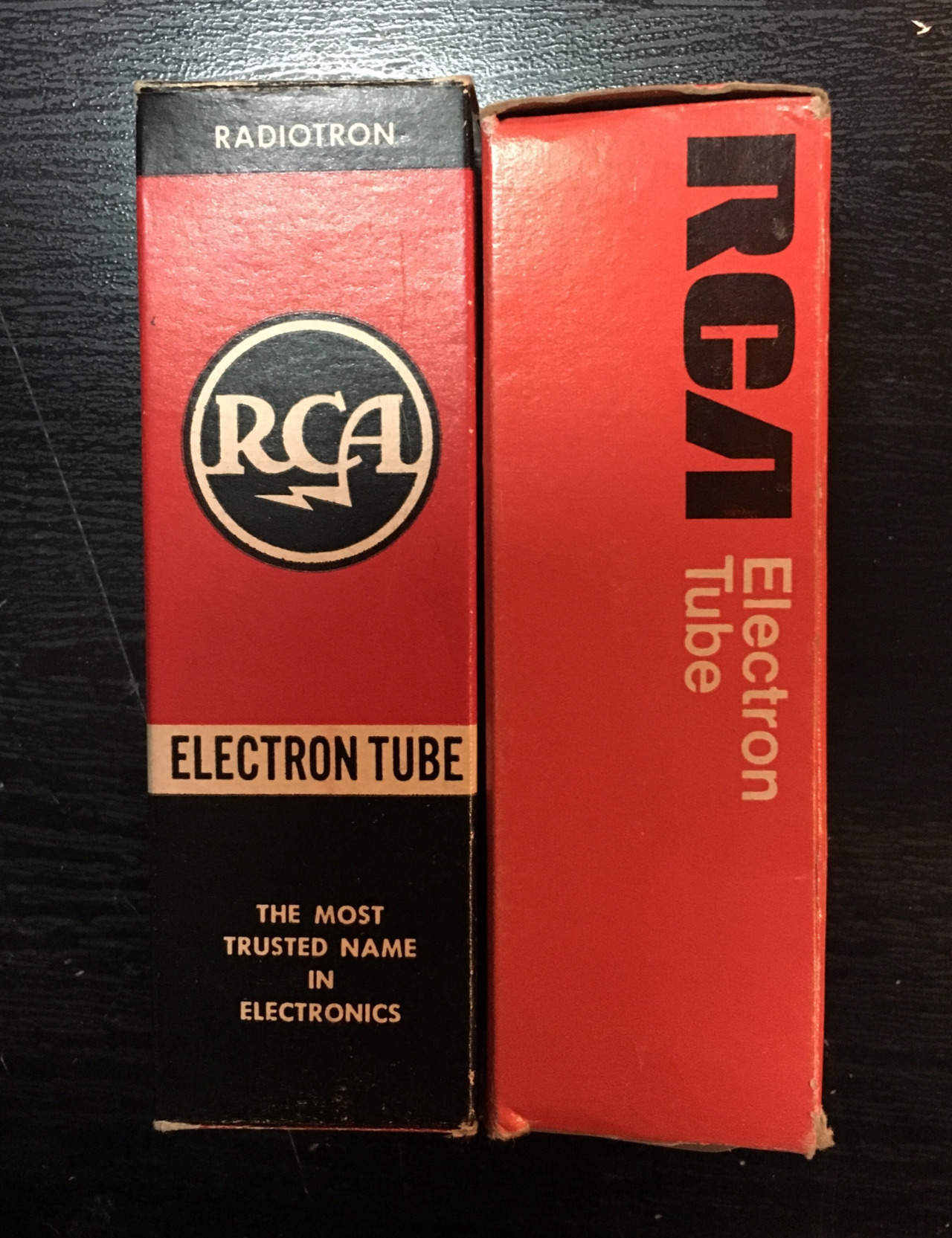
Two vacuum tube cartons, displaying different generations of the RCA logo

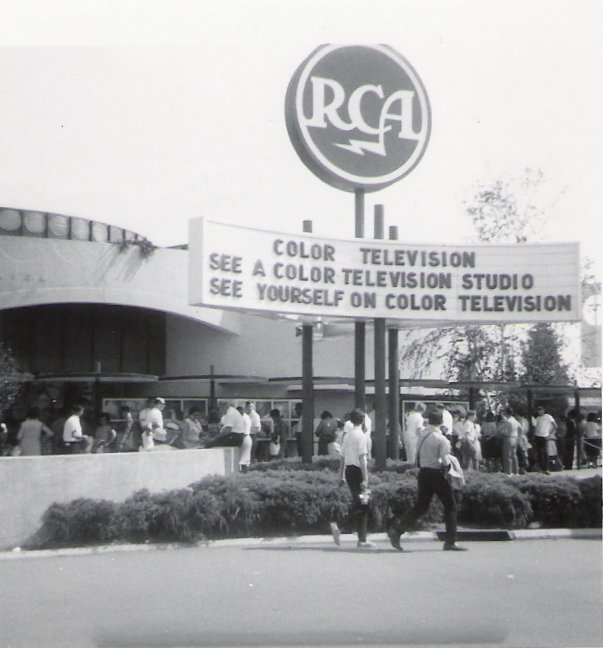
RCA Pavilion at the 1964 New York World's Fair

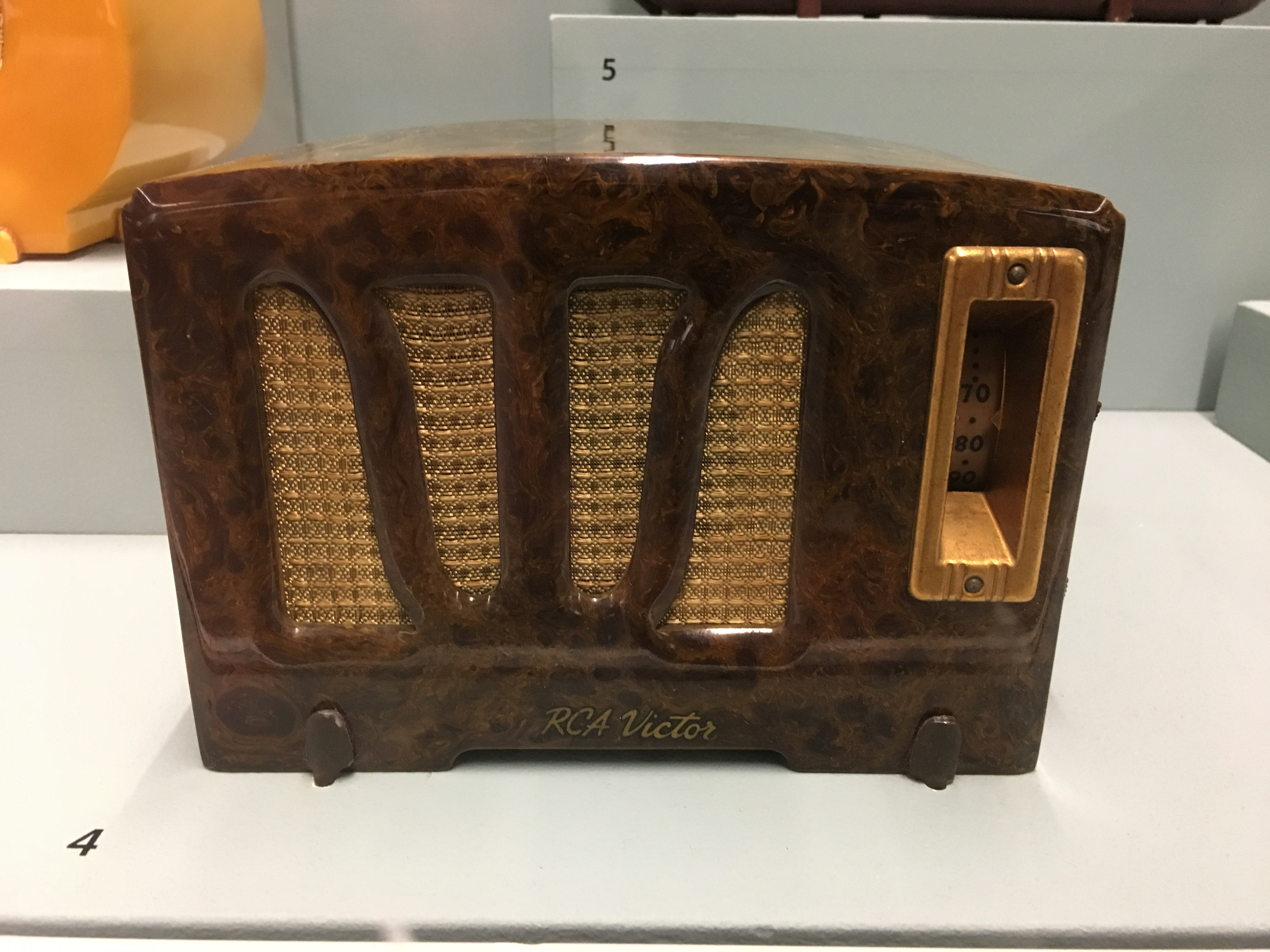
RCA Model RC-350-A (1938) radio, made of Catalin and Bakelite

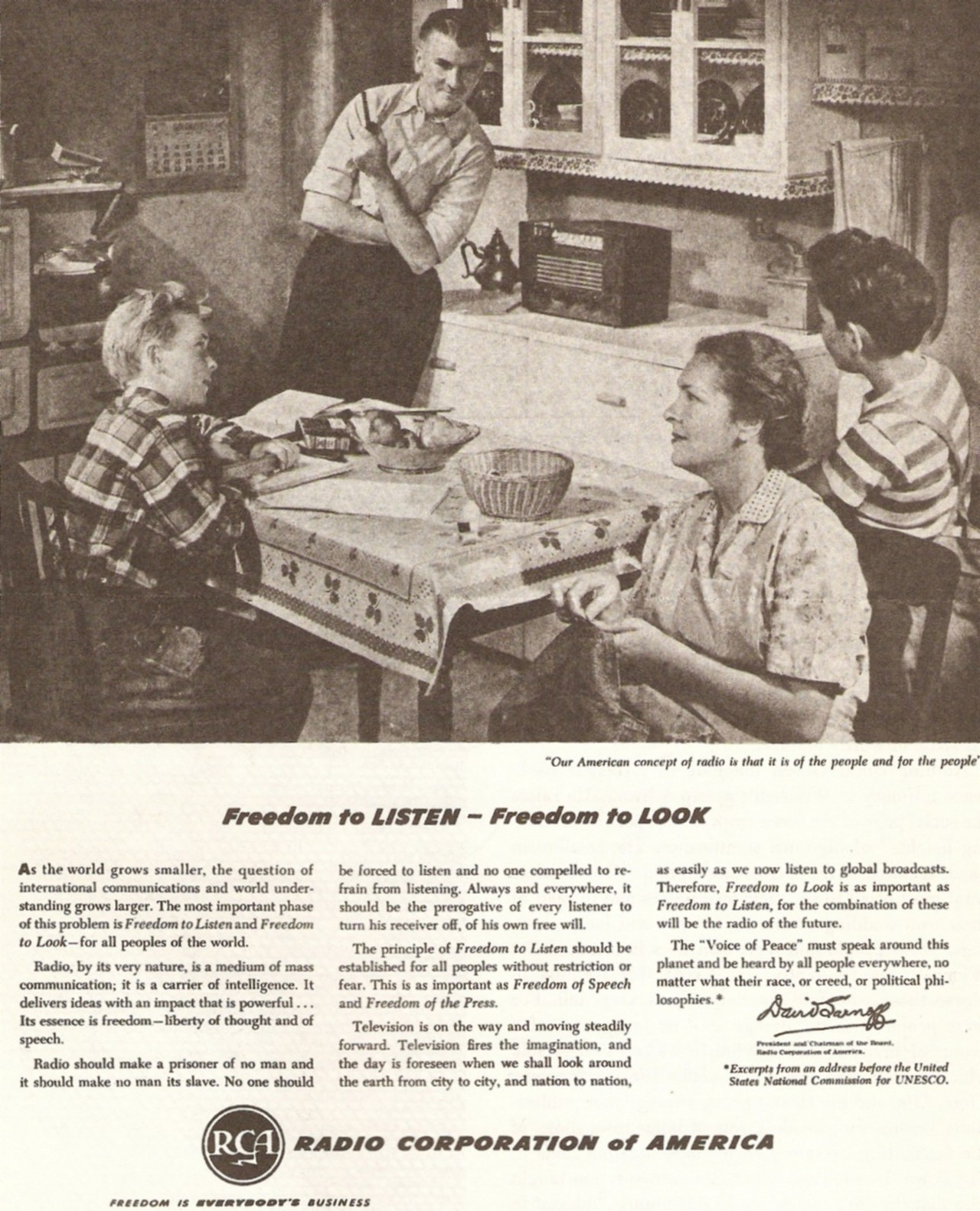
RCA Radio ad, c. 1945

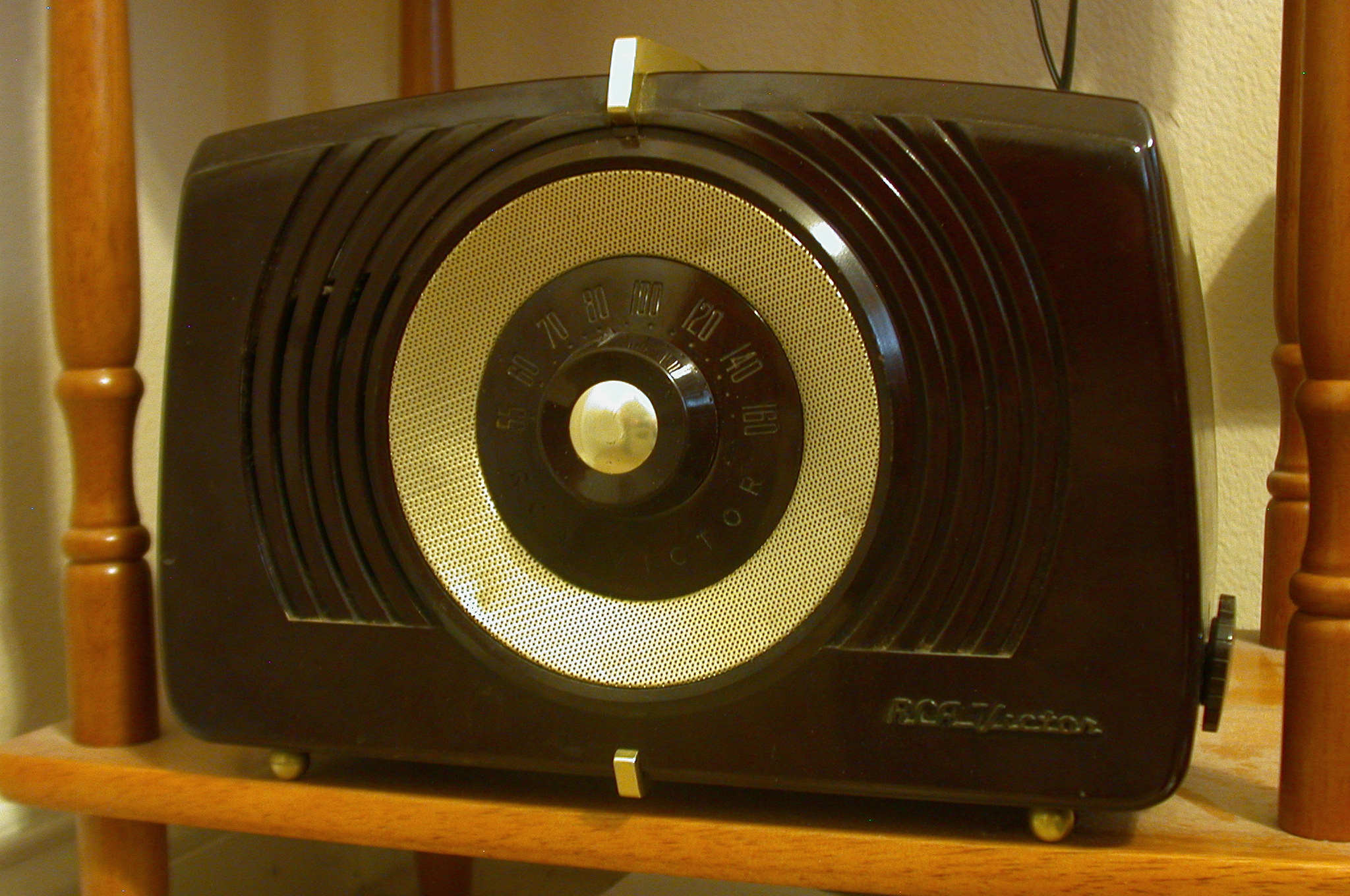
RCA Radio x551, early '50s AC/DC tabletop radio

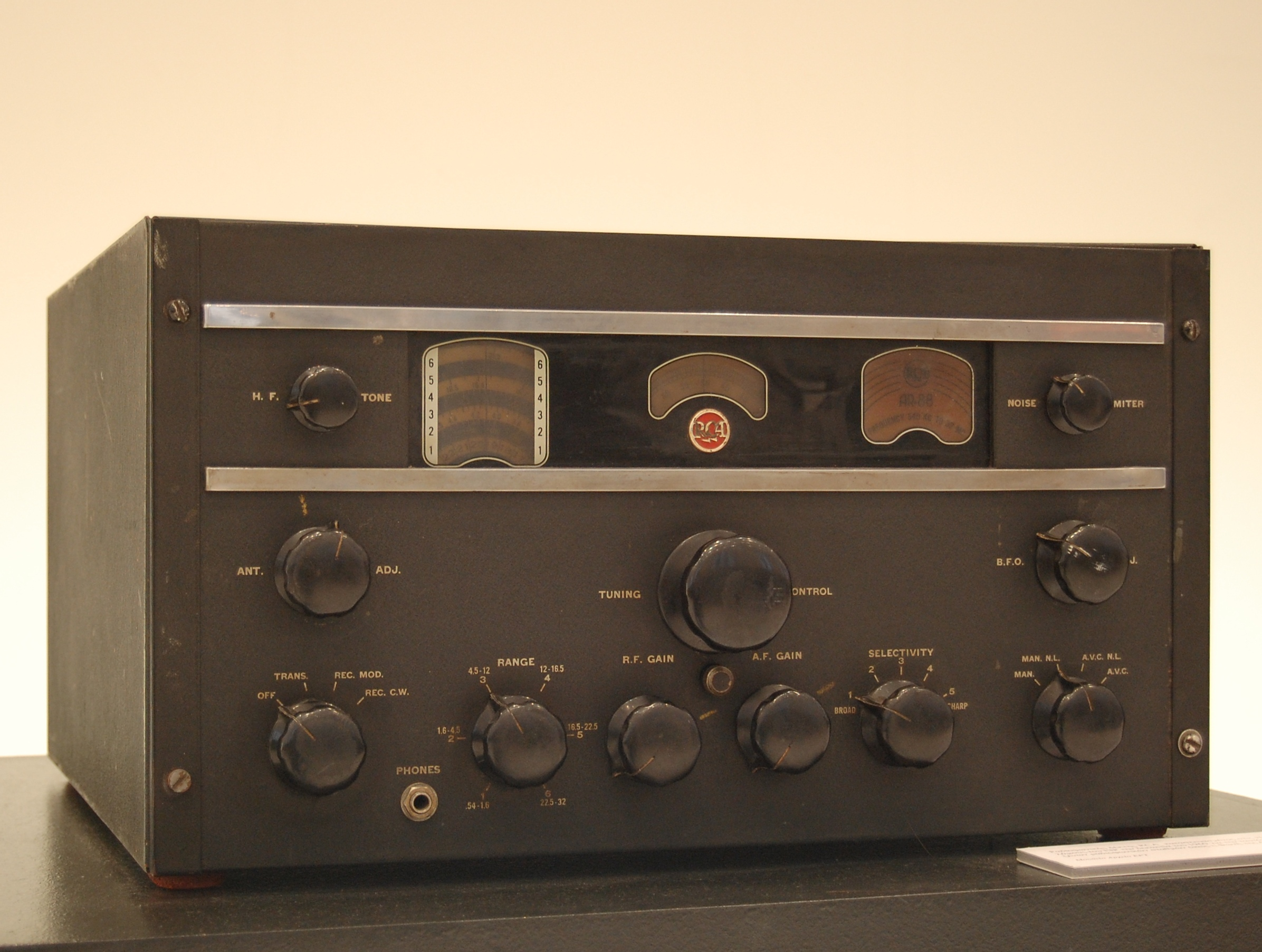
AR-88 communications receiver

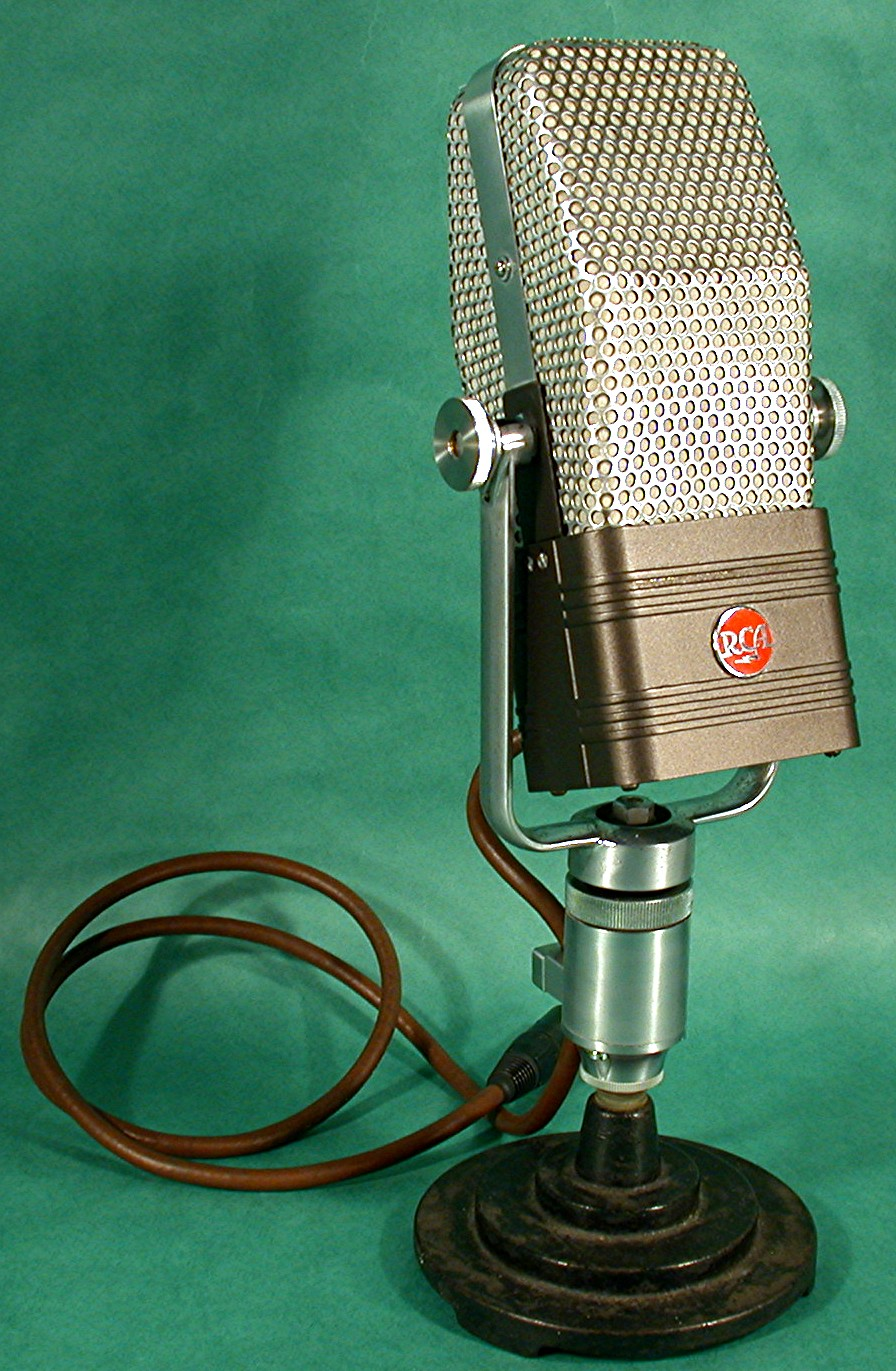
RCA 44-BX Bi-Directional Velocity Microphone

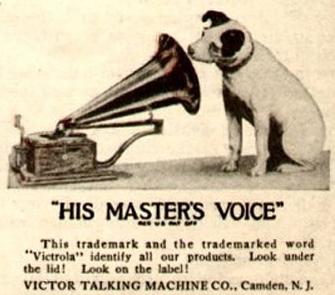
Victor Talking Machine Company's His Master's Voice logo with Nipper (1921)

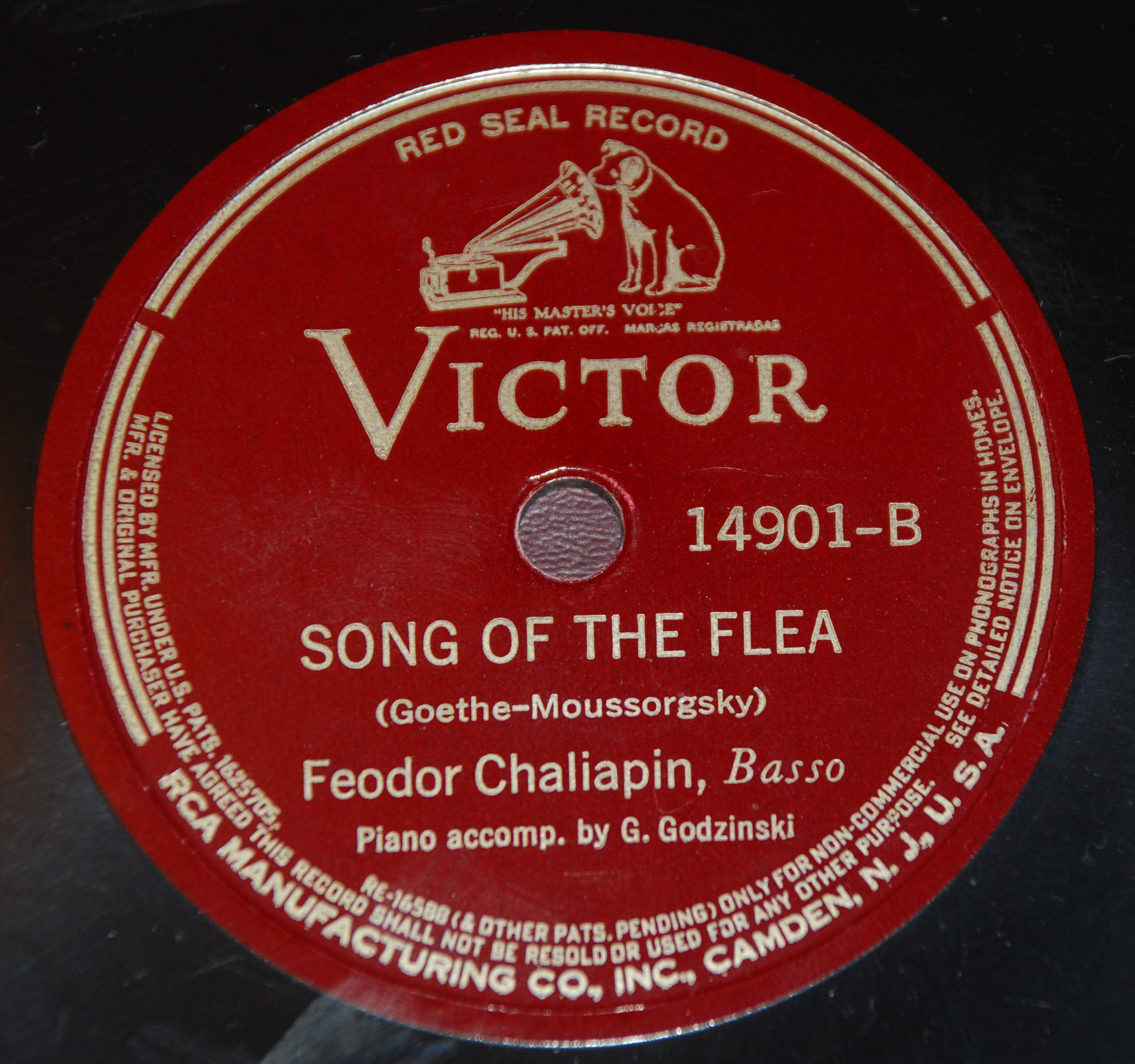
RCA Victor Red Seal Records label, late 1930s

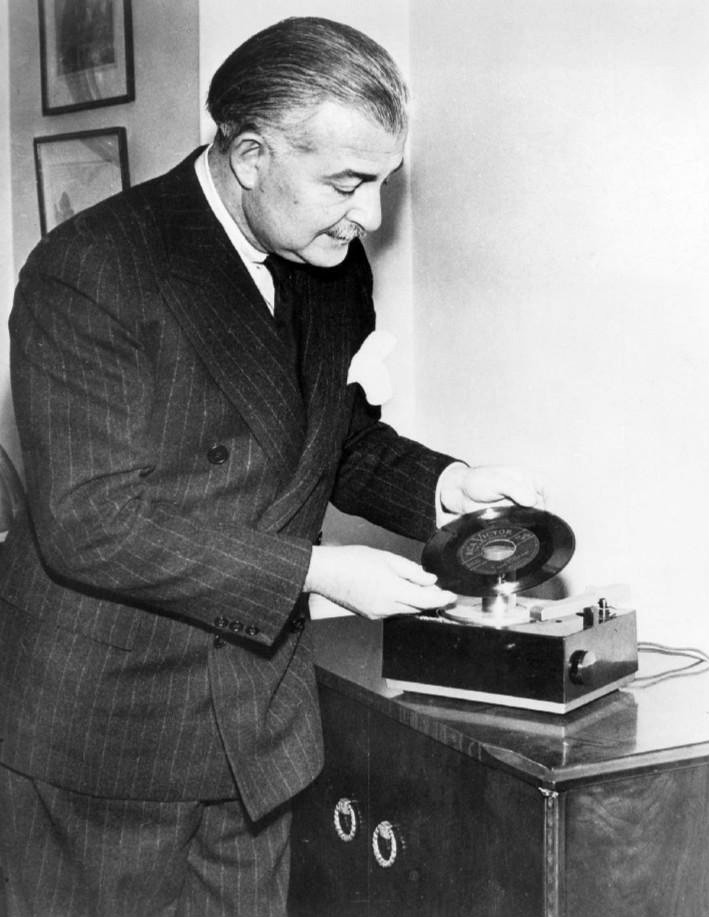
Arthur Fiedler demonstrates the new RCA Victor 45rpm player and record in February 1949.

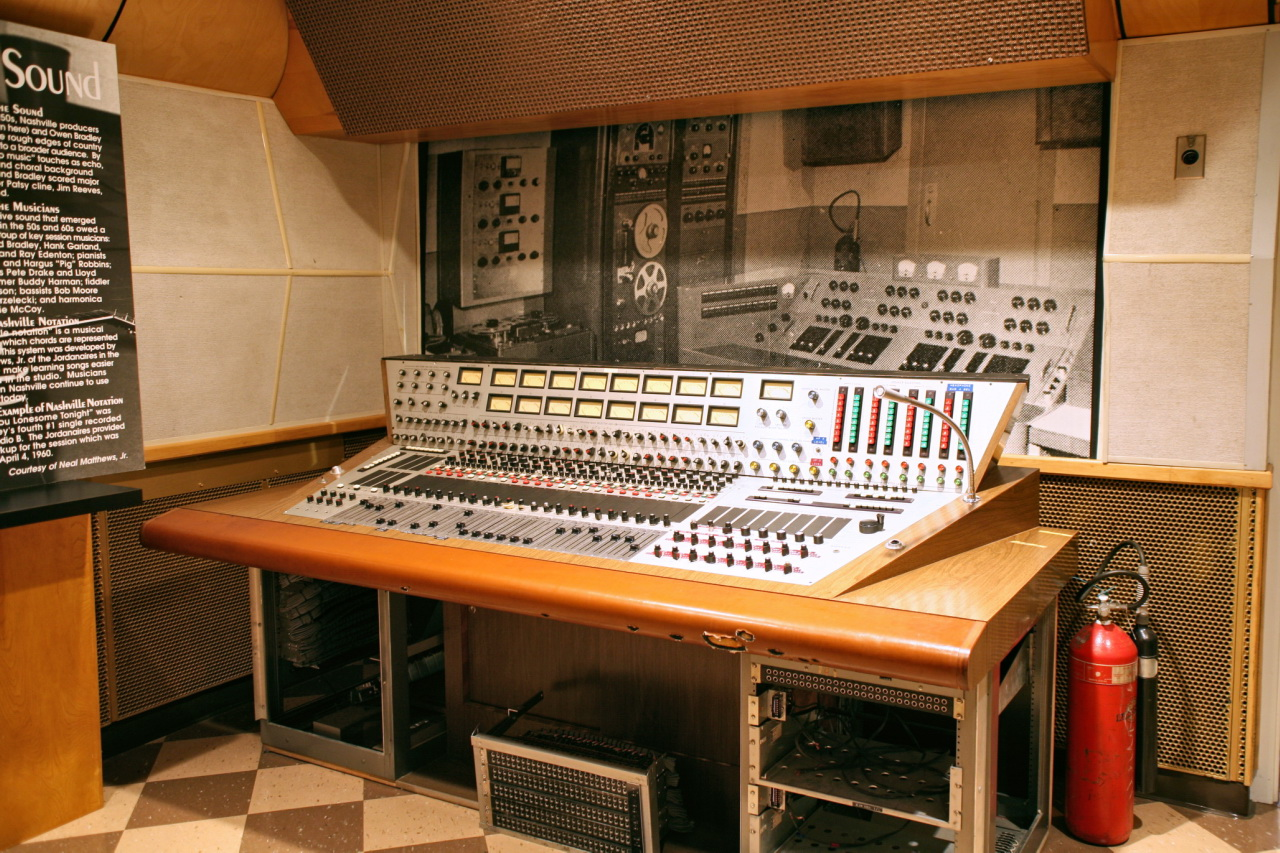
RCA Studio B recording studio in Nashville, Tennessee; known in the 1960s for being part of the Nashville sound.

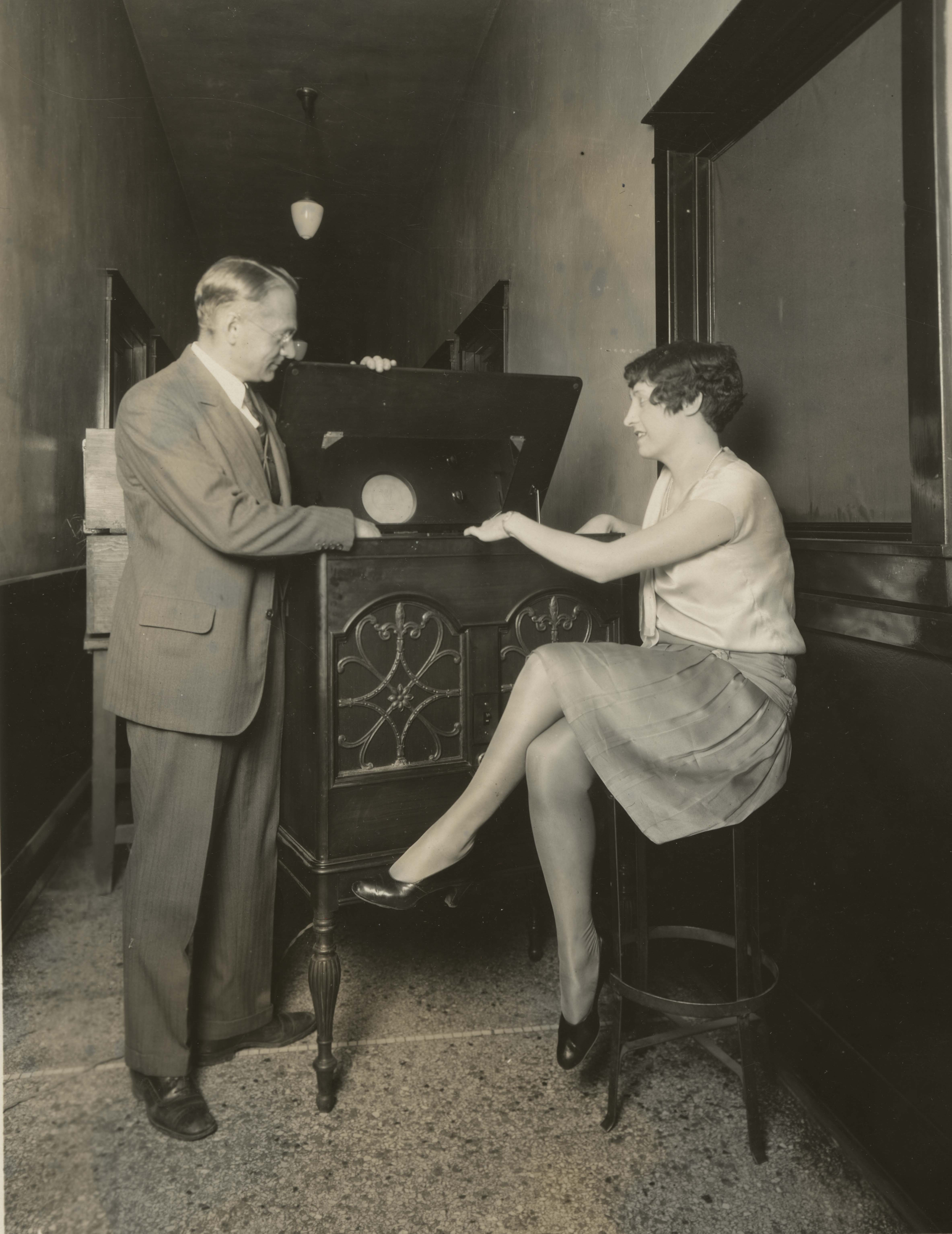
Vladimir K. Zworykin with an early experimental TV

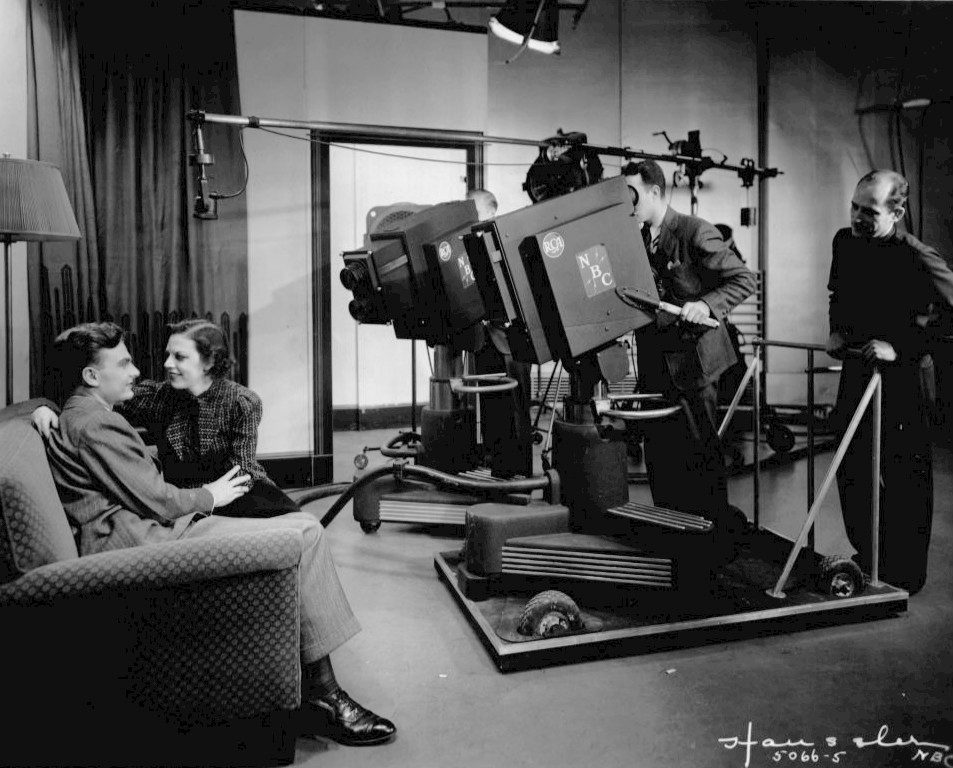
Grace Bradt and Eddie Albert in a 1936 NBC television program The Honeymooners-Grace and Eddie Show using an early RCA camera

Iconic television test pattern created by RCA in 1939

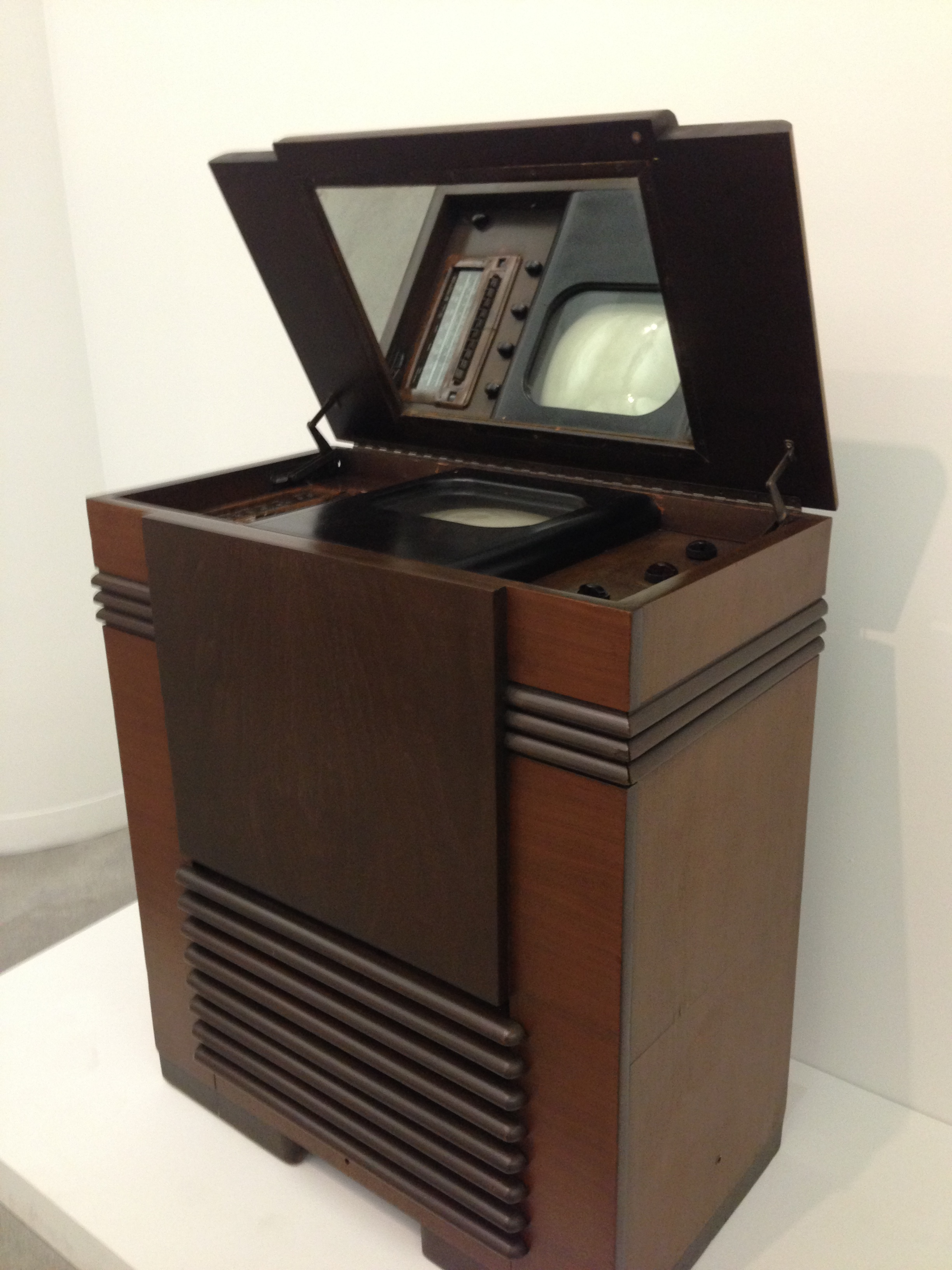
First U.S. commercial TV set, the RCA Victor TRK 12 (1939)

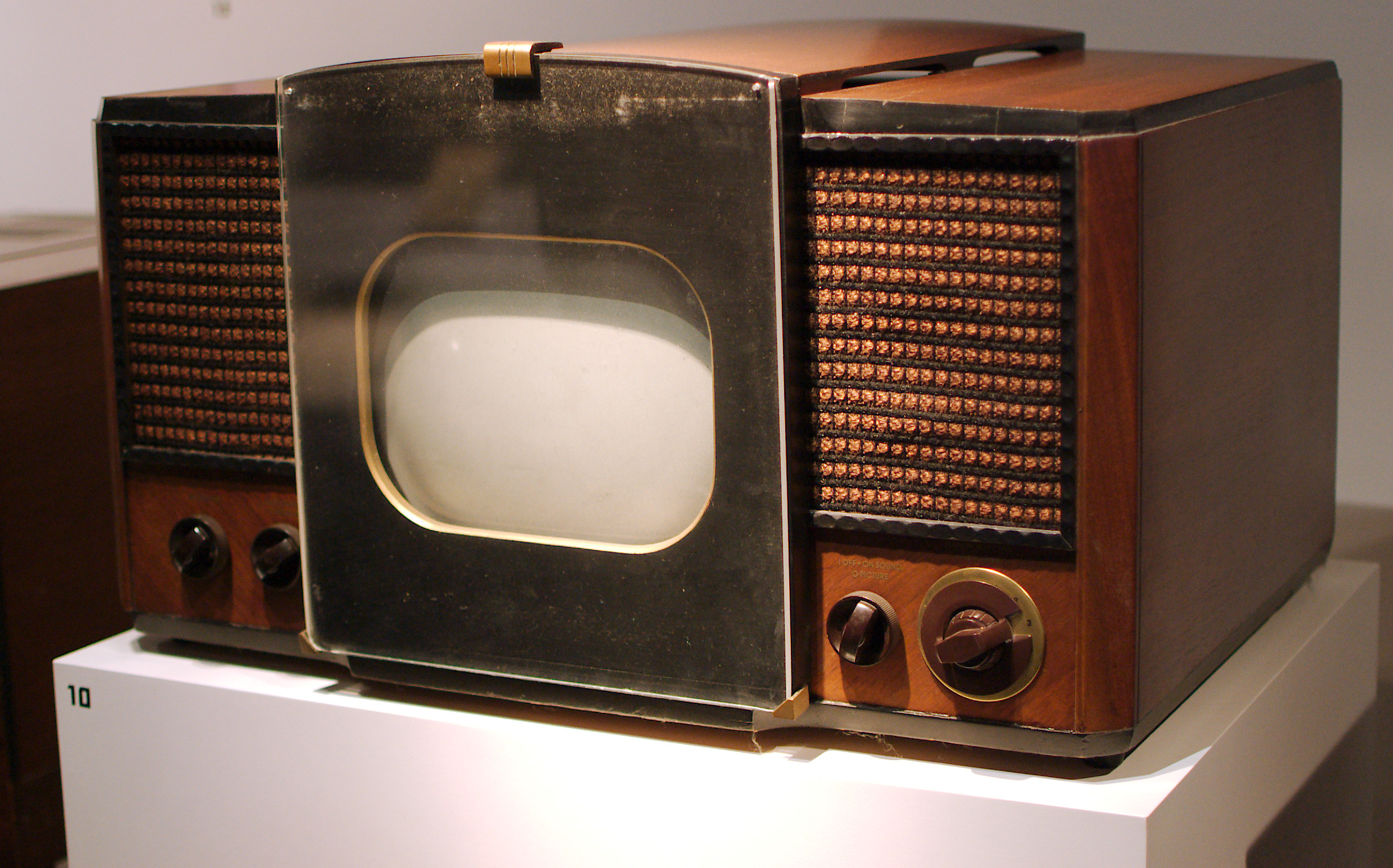
RCA 630-TS, the first mass-produced television set, sold in 1946–1947

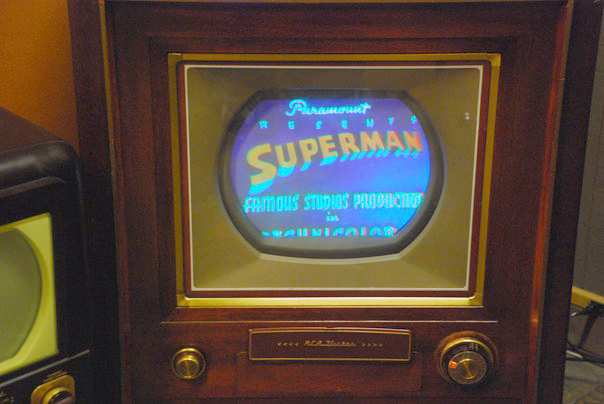
1954 RCA CT-100 TV

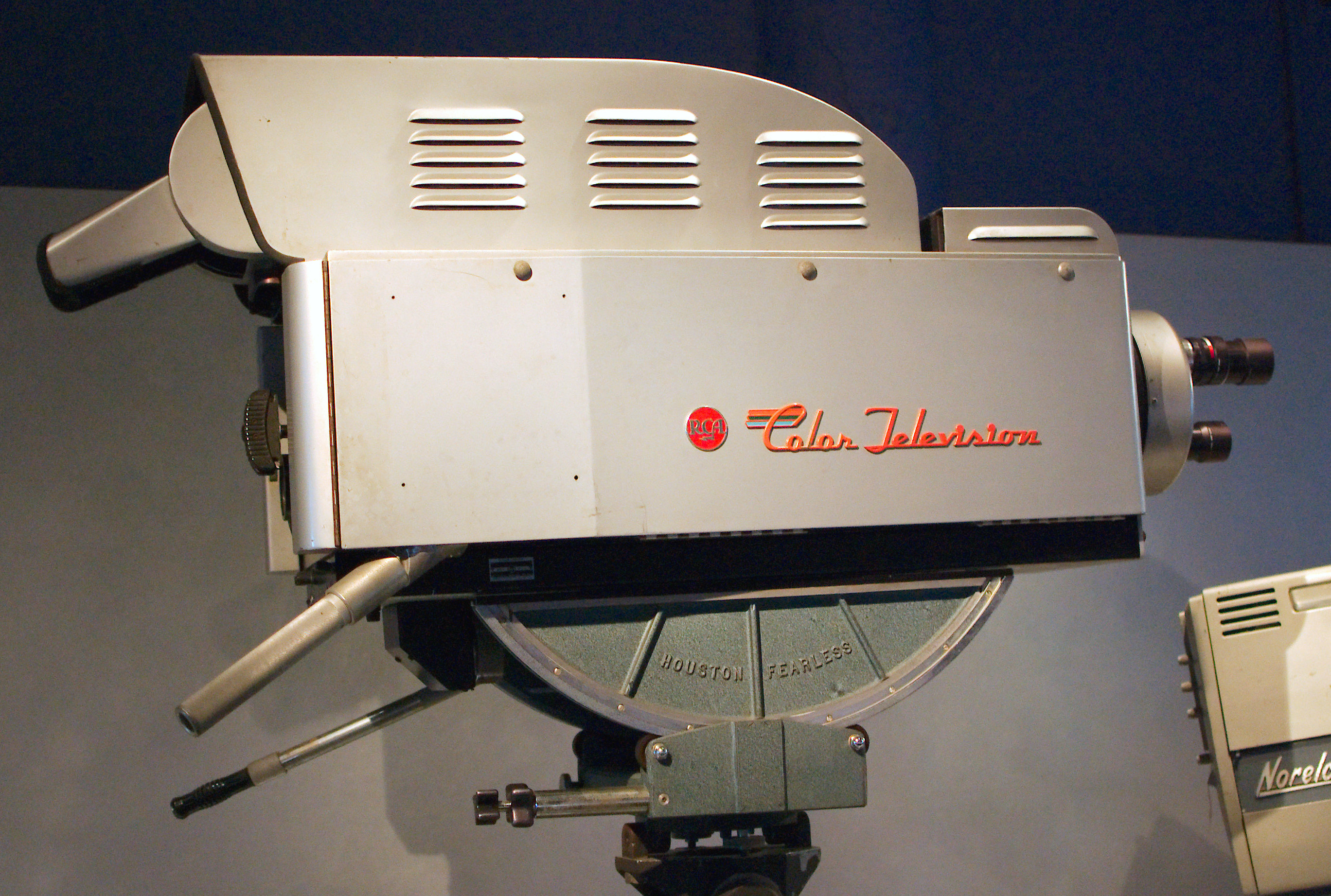
1954 RCA TK-41C dolly-mounted color broadcast camera

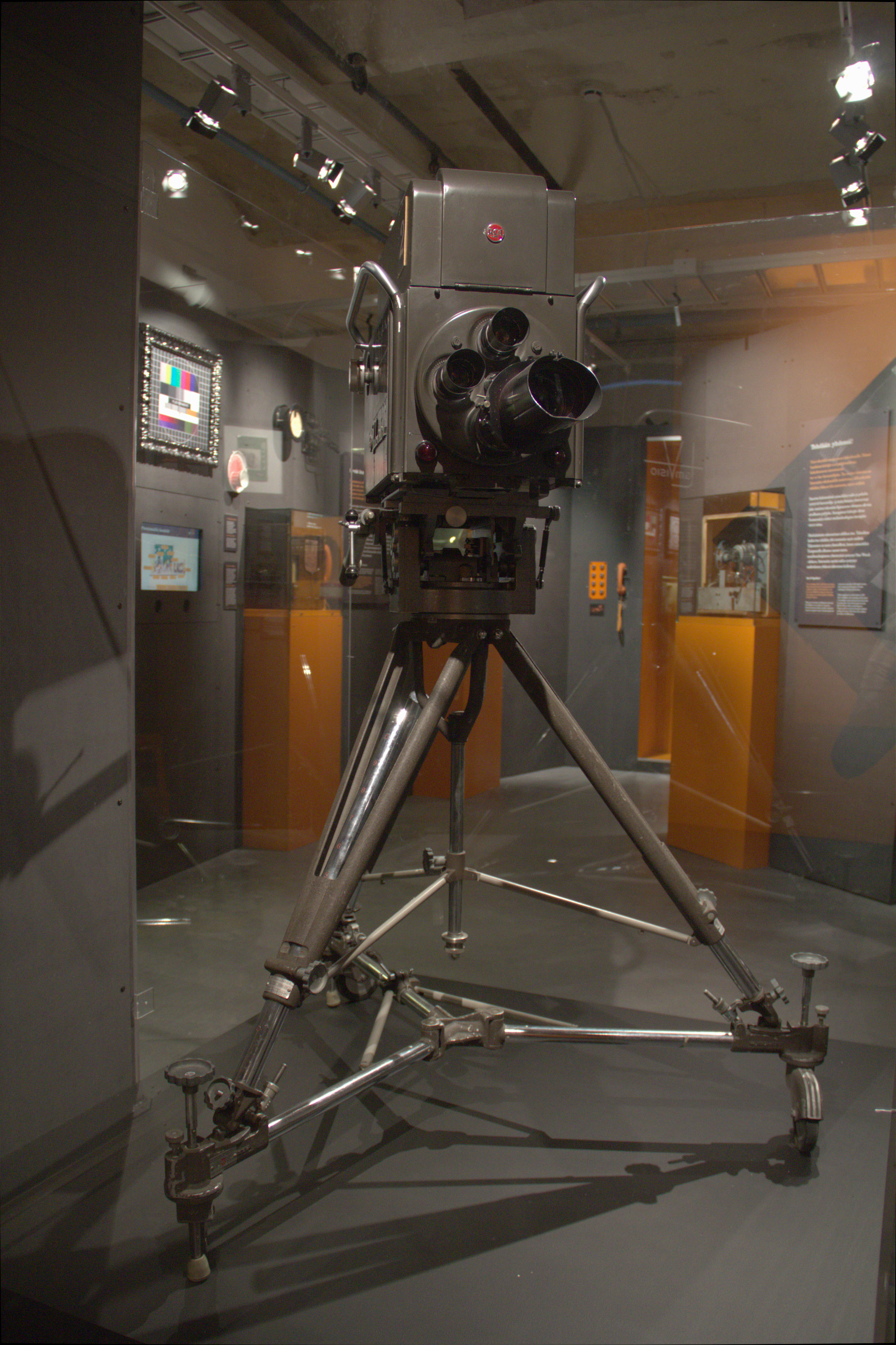
1954 RCA TK-11/TK-31 television camera

1970s-era RCA Radiotron Image Orthicon TV Camera Tube

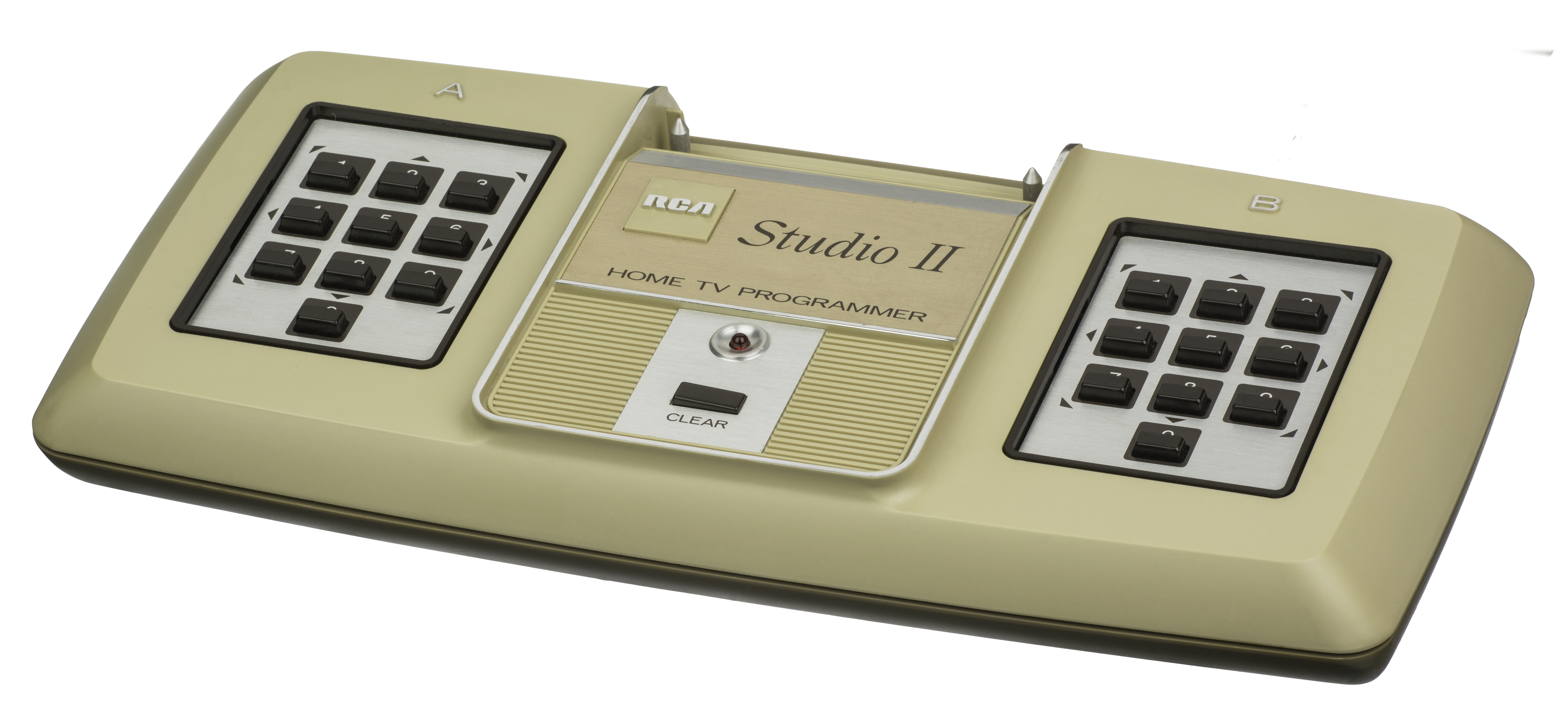
RCA Studio II home video game console (1977)

RCA Colortrak TV set, using the CTC101 chassis, c. 1980

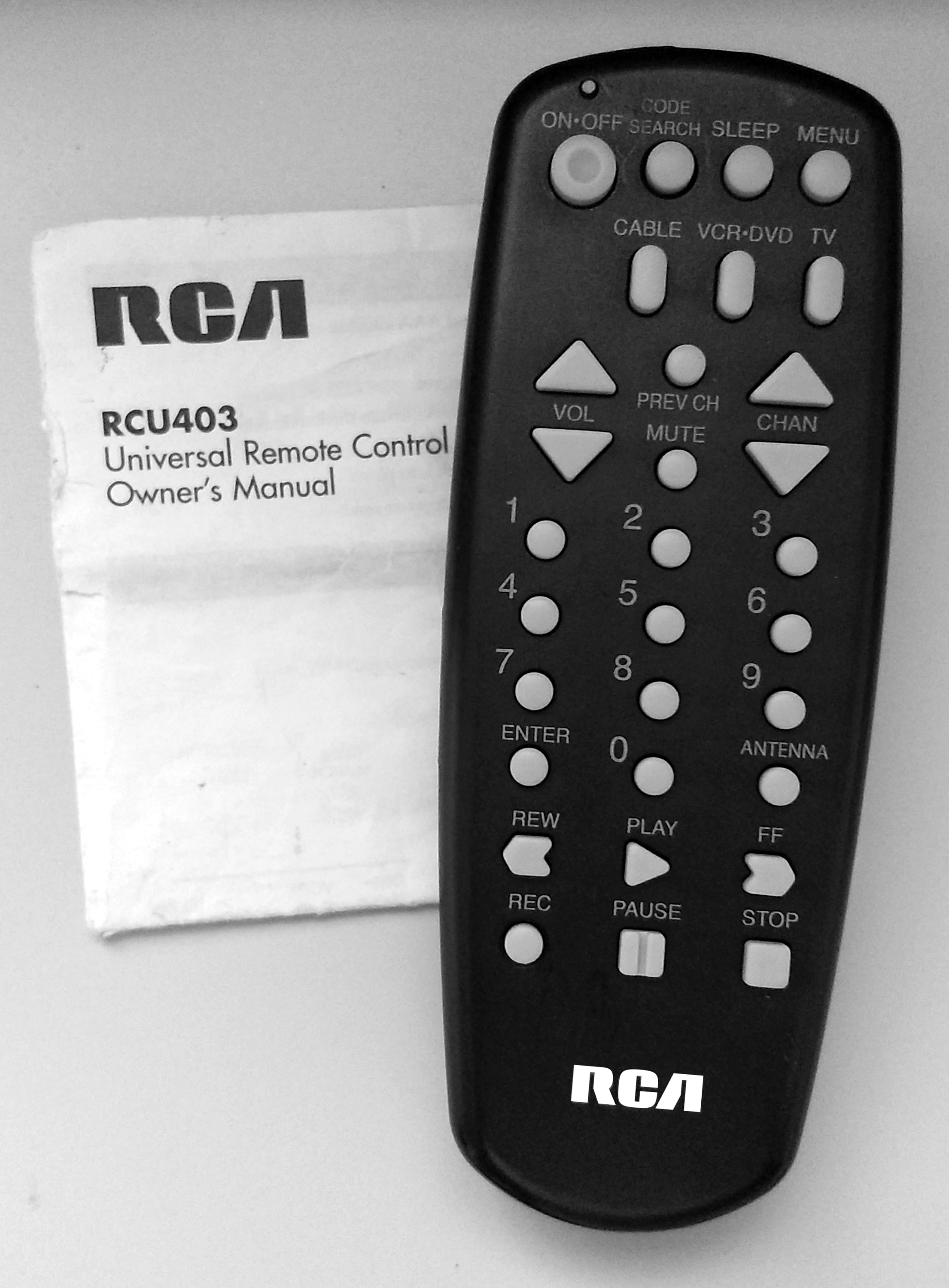
RCA Universal Remote RCU403, c. 2002–2003

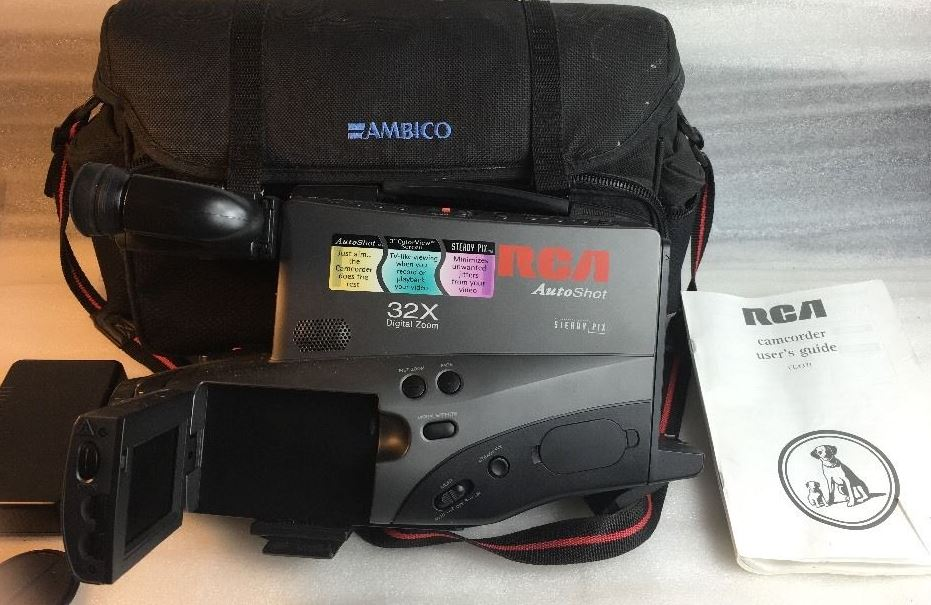
RCA-branded AutoShot VHS Camcorder, c. 1998

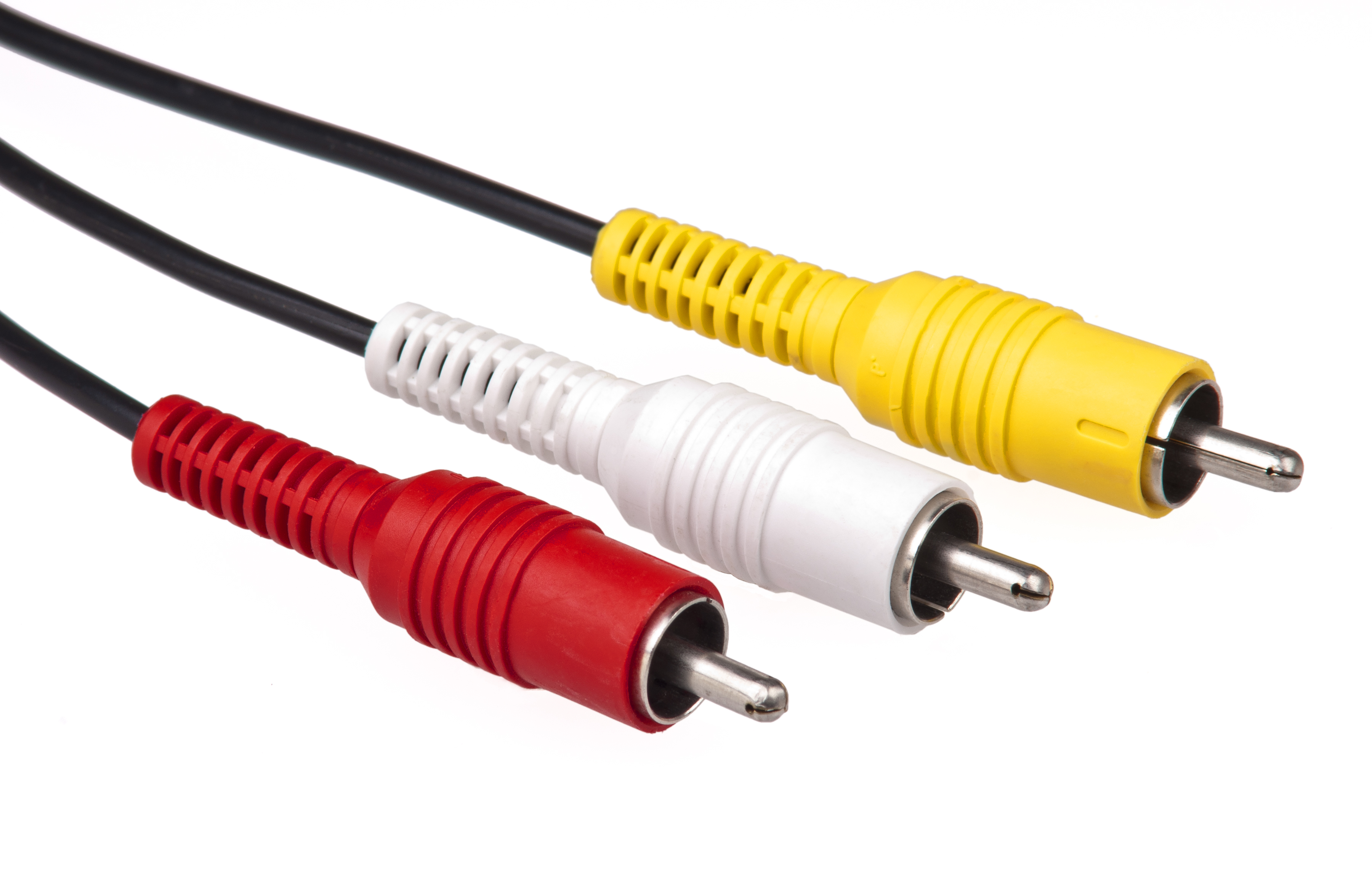
RCA connector used for audio and video

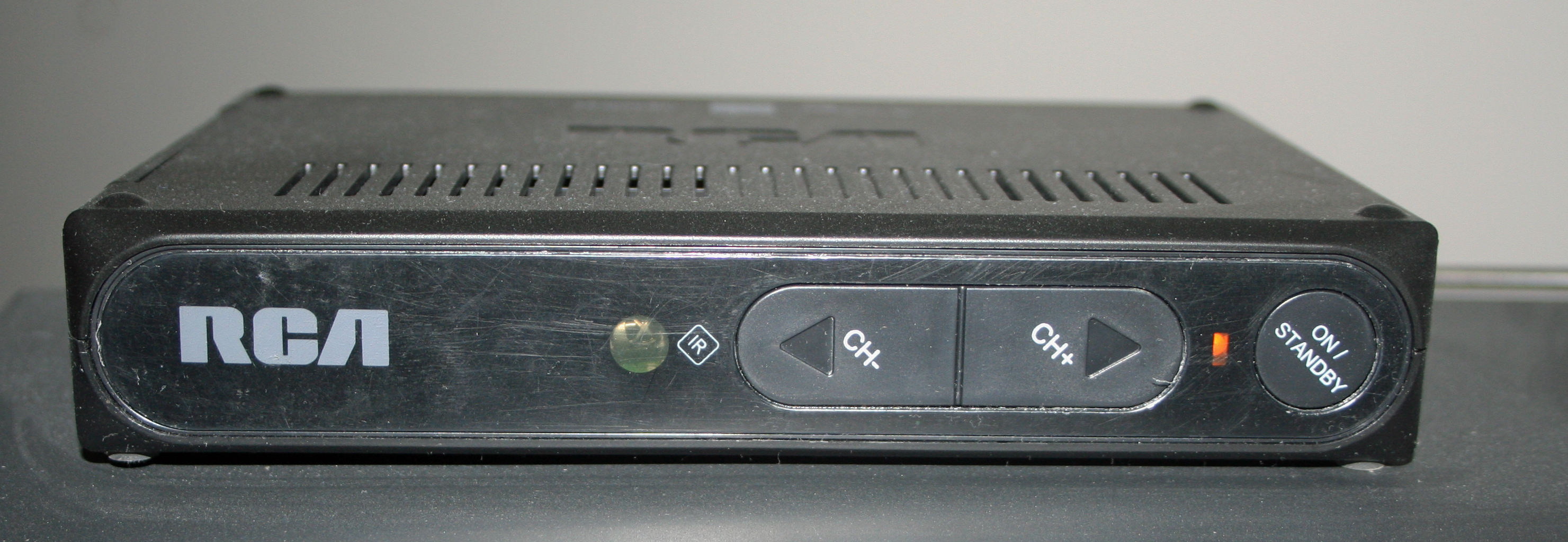
RCA digital TV converter box

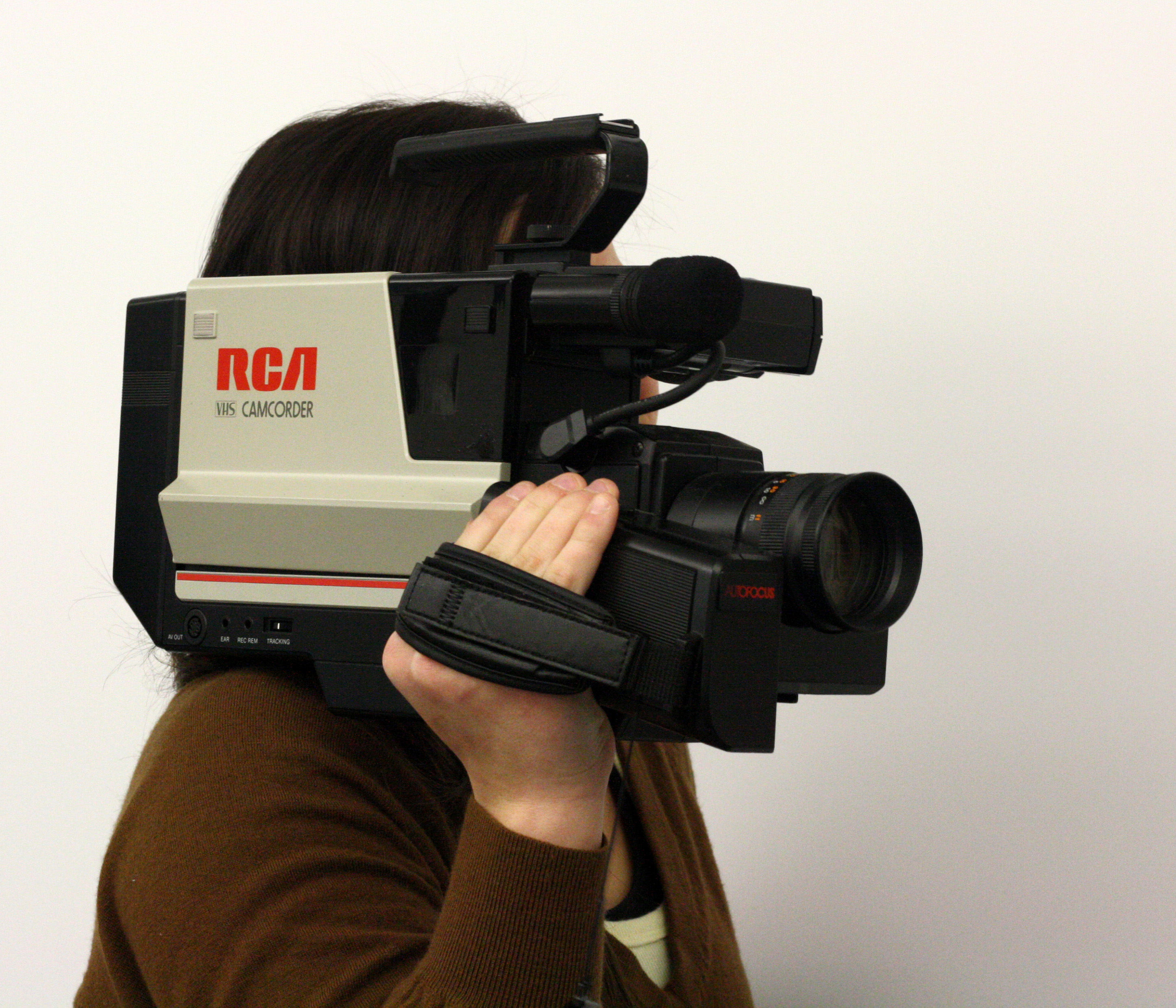
RCA VHS shoulder-mount Camcorder

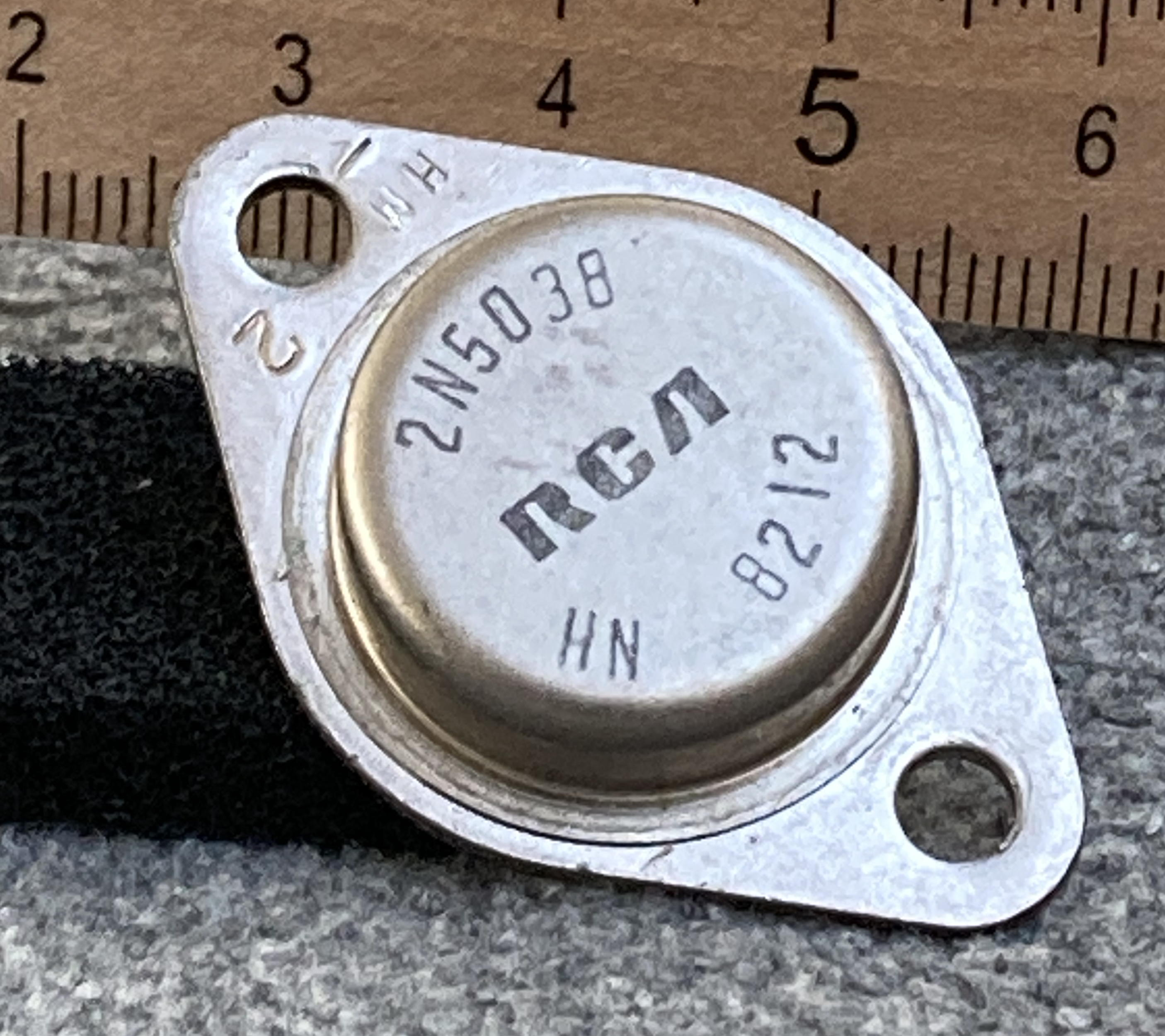
2N5038 RCA NPN silicon power transistor

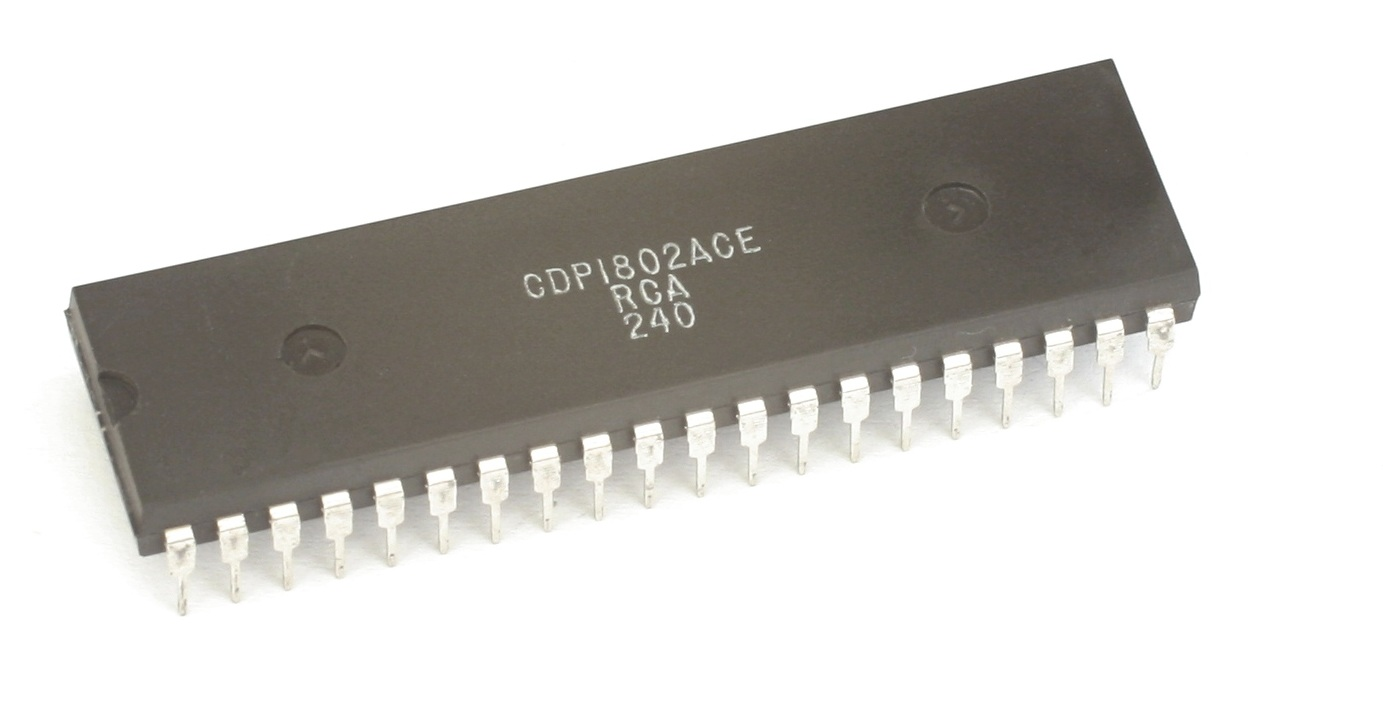
RCA 1802, sometimes known as the COSMAC, an 8-bit CMOS microprocessor from 1976

== Leadership ==
=== President ===
1. Edward Julian Nally, 1919–1923
2. James Guthrie Harbord, 1923–1930
3. David Sarnoff, 1930–1949
4. Frank Marion Folsom, 1949–1957
5. John Lawrence Burns, 1957–1961
6. Elmer William Engstrom, 1961–1965
7. Robert William Sarnoff, 1966–1971
8. Anthony Lee Conrad, 1971–1976
9. Edgar Herbert Griffiths Jr., 1976–1980
10. Maurice Remo Valente, 1980
11. Robert Rice Frederick, 1982–1987

=== Chairman of the Board ===
1. Owen D. Young, 1919–1930
2. James Guthrie Harbord, 1930–1947
3. David Sarnoff, 1947–1970
4. Robert William Sarnoff, 1970–1975
5. Edgar Herbert Griffiths Jr., 1975–1981
6. Thornton Frederick Bradshaw Jr., 1981–1987

== See also ==
- 2N3055 Popular silicon NPN power transistor
- Ampliphase
- Berliner Gramophone Company, whose Canadian operation became RCA Victor of Canada
- Claude E. Robinson, American pioneer in advertising and opinion survey research
- CMOS 4000 series
- Dimensia, a high-end advanced trademark TV for RCA
- Electrofax
- Elmer T. Cunningham
- Ernst F. W. Alexanderson RCA's first Chief Engineer, 1920–1924
- Film chain – RCA TK-26, TK-27 and TK-28
- George H. Brown, a research engineer who headed RCA's development of color television
- List of phonograph manufacturers
- Missile Test Project
- RCA Mark II Sound Synthesizer
- Superette (radio) RCA trademark for their line of superheterodyne receivers during the early 1930s.
- WSC (radio station)
- XL-100, RCA trademark for extended life and 100% solid state chassis on color television sets in the 1970s and later.
- RCA 501, transistor computer manufactured by RCA beginning in 1958.
