= Videodisc =

Random-access disc containing audio and analog video signals

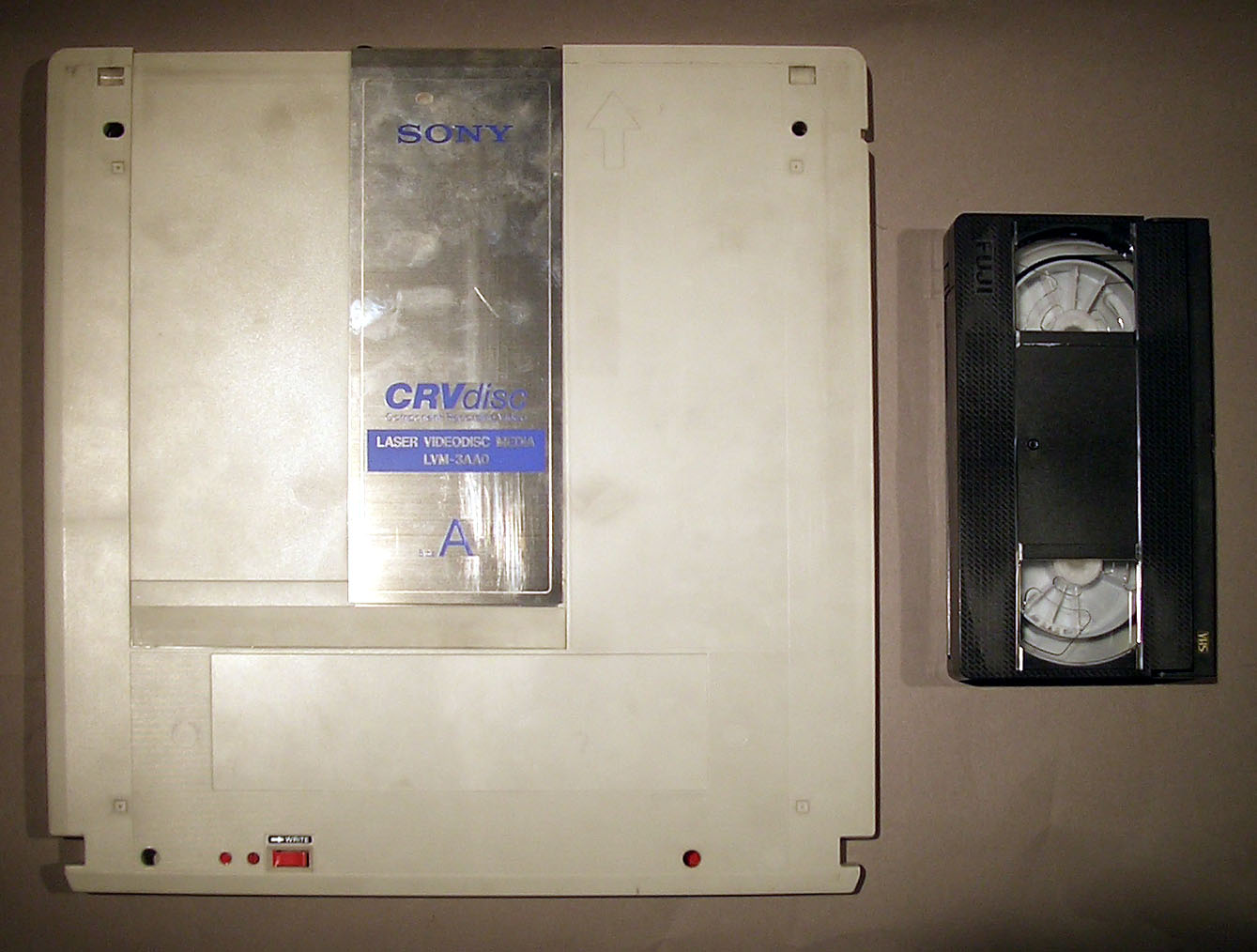
Videodisc and VHS cassette

Videodisc (or video disc) is a general term for a laser- or stylus-readable random-access disc that contains both audio and analog video signals recorded in an analog form. Typically, it is a reference to any such media that predates the mainstream popularity of the DVD format. The first mainstream official Videodisc was the Television Electronic Disc (TED) Videodisc, and the newest is Ultra HD Blu-ray. As of 2026, the active video disc formats are DVD, Blu-ray and Ultra HD Blu-ray. In some regions, Video CD (VCD) and Super Video CD (SVCD) are still manufactured.

== History ==
Georges Demeny on March 3, 1892 patented a "phonoscope", designed in 1891, that can project chronophotographic pictures on a glass disc.

Eadweard Muybridge used his zoopraxiscope to project chronophotographic pictures on a glass disc in 1893.

E & H T Anthony, a camera maker based in New York, marketed in 1898 a combination motion picture camera and projector called "The Spiral" that could capture 200 images arranged in a spiral on an 8-inch diameter glass plate. When played back at 16 frames per second, it would give a running time of 13 seconds.

Theodore Brown patented in 1907 (UK patent GB190714493) a photographic disk system of recording approximately 1,200 images in a spiral of pictures on a 10-inch disk. Played back at 16 frames per second, a disk provides around one and a quarter minutes of material. The system was marketed as the Urban Spirograph by Charles Urban, and discs were produced - but it soon disappeared.

John Logie Baird created the Phonovision system in the late 1920s, which allows him to successfully capture the crude video signal of 30 scanning lines onto gramophone discs. However, due to limitations, the system never made it as a commercial product.

P.M.G. Toulon, a French inventor working at Westinghouse Electric during the 1950s and 1960s, patented a system in 1952 (US Patent 3198880) which uses a slow spinning disc with a spiral track of photographically 1.5 millimeter wide recorded frames, along with a flying spot scanner, which sweeps over them to produce a video image. This was intended to be synchronously combined with playback from a vinyl record. It appears a working system was never produced. It has similarities with the tape based Electronic Video Recording system, which was released for professional use.

Westinghouse Electric Corporation developed a system in 1965 called Phonovid, that allows for the playback of 400 stored still images, along with 40 minutes of sound. The system uses a standard record player, and builds the picture up slowly.

The Television Electronic Disc, a mechanical system, was rolled out in Germany and Austria in 1970 by Telefunken. The 12-inch discs have a capacity of about eight minutes; however, it was abandoned in favor of VHS by its parent company.

In Japan, the TOSBAC computer was using digital video disks to display color pictures at 256x256 image resolution in 1972. In 1973, Hitachi announced a video disc capable of recording 15-colour still images on a disc. The same year, Sony announced a video disc recorder, similar to the Sony Mavica format.

In 1975, Hitachi introduced a video disc system in which chrominance, luminance and sound information are encoded holographically. Each frame is recorded as a 1mm diameter hologram on a 305mm disc, while a laser beam reads out the hologram from three angles. It has a capacity of 54,000 frames, with a running time of 30 minutes for the NTSC color standard or 36 minutes for PAL/SECAM.

Visc is a mechanical video disc system developed in Japan by Matsushita subsidiary National Panasonic in 1978. The 12-inch vinyl disc is spun at 500 rpm with each revolution holding three frames of color video, with a total of up to an hour of video on each side of the disc. Discs can be recorded in either a 30-minute-per-side format, or a 60-minute-per-side-format. A later incarnation of the system uses 9-inch discs in caddies capable of storing 75 minutes per side. The system was abandoned in January 1980 in favor of JVC's VHD system.

The DiscoVision system was released in America in 1978. Developed by MCA and Philips of the Netherlands, it utilizes an optical reflective system read by a laser beam. It was renamed several times, as VLP, Laservision, and CD Video. Finally, Japan's Pioneer Electronic Corporation trademarked it as LaserDisc, the name by which it is perhaps best known. The format struggled to gain wide acceptance in the consumer market, and Pioneer became the chief sponsor of the format when MCA, and later Philips, withdrew their support for it. The high cost of both players and discs was the main reason for its ultimate demise.

Thomson-CSF created a system that uses thin flexible video discs and a transmissive laser system, with light source and pickup on opposite sides of the disc. The system was marketed for industrial and educational use in 1980. Each side of the disc can hold 50,000 still CAV frames, and both sides can be read without removing the disc. Thomson exited the videodisc market in 1981.

RCA produced a system called CED under the brand SelectaVision in 1981. The system uses a physical pickup riding in grooves of a pressed disc, reading variance in capacitance in the underlying disc. The system competed with Laserdisc for a few years before being abandoned in 1984, although movie studios continued releasing titles in the format until 1986.

JVC produced a system very similar to CED called Video High Density (VHD). It was launched in 1983 and marketed predominantly in Japan. It is a capacitance contact system but without grooves. VHD discs were adopted in the UK by Thorn EMI which started to develop a consumer catalogue, including bespoke material. Development for the mass market was halted in late 1983, but the system remained on sale for educational and business markets as a computer-controlled video system until the late 1980s.

Laserfilm, a videodisc format developed by McDonnell Douglas, was released in 1984.

MovieCD, by SIRIUS Publishing, Inc. (1995?), is a format that uses a traditional CD-ROM disc for playback on a Windows PC containing a video file of a movie encoded in a proprietary codec developed by the publisher (the MotionPixels codec, also used in some PC video games in the mid-to-late 1990s), with the disc also containing codec and playback software for the movie. The quality is somewhat low due to the compression the MotionPixels codec used, resulting in a playback resolution of only 320x236 at 16 frames per second, using 16-bit high color.

DVD (Digital Video Disc, or Digital Versatile Disc) was released in 1996. It is a hybrid of Philips and Sony's MM-CD (Multi-Media Compact Disc) format and Toshiba's SD (Super Density) format. The last-minute adoption of the hybrid DVD format was agreed to by all three companies in an effort to avoid a damaging format war, similar to that between Beta and VHS in the 1970s and 1980s. Toshiba failed to reach a similar compromise agreement with Sony in the race to develop a high-definition optical video disc format in the 2000s. This proved to be a costly mistake for Toshiba (and the format's co-developers, NEC and Microsoft), and the AOD (Advanced Optical Disc) format, later renamed HD DVD, lost a format war with Sony's Blu-ray Disc (BD) format. This format war delayed acceptance of either format, and Blu-ray Disc has only recently gained traction in the consumer market, where it competes with the continued success of DVD and the rise of streaming movie services such as Netflix.

== Classification ==
Video discs can be classed based on their playback mechanism:

- Mechanical
  - Phonovision
  - Phonovid
  - TeD
  - Visc
- Capacitance-based
  - CED, VHD
- Magnetic
  - Data Disc VDR series
- Optical discs
  - Reflective
    - LaserDisc, CD, DVD, Blu-ray, etc.
  - Transmissive
    - Thomson-CSF system
    - Laserfilm

== See also ==
- Multiple Sub-Nyquist Sampling Encoding (MUSE), an early high-definition video system
