= Laserfilm =

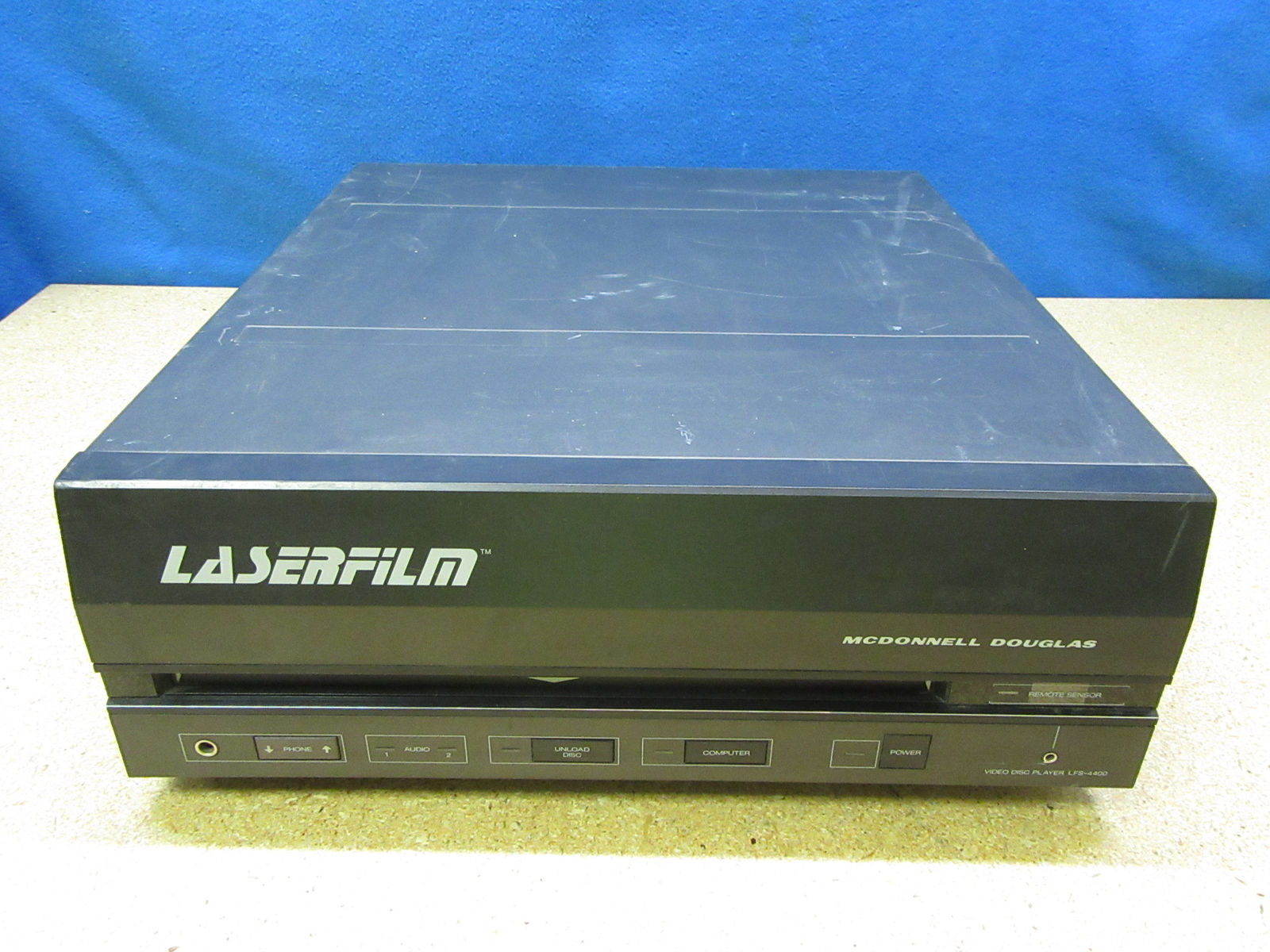
The device itself

Laserfilm was a videodisc format developed by McDonnell-Douglas in 1984 that was a transmissive laser-based playback medium (unlike its competitor, LaserDisc, which was a reflective system).

== Description ==
It worked by having the laser shine through one side of the disc to a receiving sensor on the other side, where the beam of the laser would be interrupted by a spiral of small dots on the disc.

This would in turn modulate the laser beam to represent the video and audio information, which was then interpreted by the receiving sensor receiving the beam on the other side.

The disc was made out of ordinary photographic film (hence the format's name), which was mounted in a caddy for playback, much like the RCA Selectavision CED and VHD videodisc systems.

Laserfilm players were chiefly manufactured in Japan by Sansui on an OEM basis to McDonnell-Douglas' specifications and branded with their logotype, and weren't marketed successfully outside the company.

However, the format was employed for use in their flight simulators, by linking several players together.

The Laserfilm format was originally based on an earlier videodisc format called ARDEV, developed by a company of the same name which was originally a subsidiary of Atlantic Richfield until 1981.

At that time, ARDEV and all of its videodisc technologies were acquired by McDonnell-Douglas.
