= Sarnoff Corporation =

Electronics research-and-development company

- Type: Private
- Industry: Science; Technology; Software; Electronics; Computer hardware IT consulting
- Founded: 1988
- Defunct: January 3, 2011
- Fate: Merged with SRI International
- Successor: SRI International
- Headquarters: 201 Washington Rd, Princeton, New Jersey, U.S.
- Area served: Worldwide
- Key people: William A. Jeffrey; President and CEO of SRI; Mark A. Clifton; Last CEO of Sarnoff Corporation; General Manager of SRI Princeton
- Services: Research
- Parent: SRI International

Sarnoff Corporation was a research-and-development company specializing in vision, video, and semiconductor technology. It was named for David Sarnoff, the longtime leader of RCA and NBC, and had headquarters in West Windsor Township, New Jersey, though with a Princeton address.

The cornerstone of Sarnoff Corporation's David Sarnoff Research Center in the Princeton vicinity was laid just before the attack on Pearl Harbor in 1941. That facility, later Sarnoff Corporation headquarters, was the site of several historic developments, including color television, CMOS integrated circuit technology, and electron microscopy.

Following 47 years as a central research laboratory for its corporate owner RCA (and briefly for successor GE) as RCA Laboratories, in 1988 the David Sarnoff Research Center was transitioned to Sarnoff Corporation, a wholly owned subsidiary of SRI International. On January 3, 2011, Sarnoff Corporation was integrated into its parent company, SRI International, and continues to engage in similar research-and-development activities at the Princeton, New Jersey, facility. Although located adjacent to Princeton University, the two are not, and have never been, directly affiliated.

== Science and technology ==
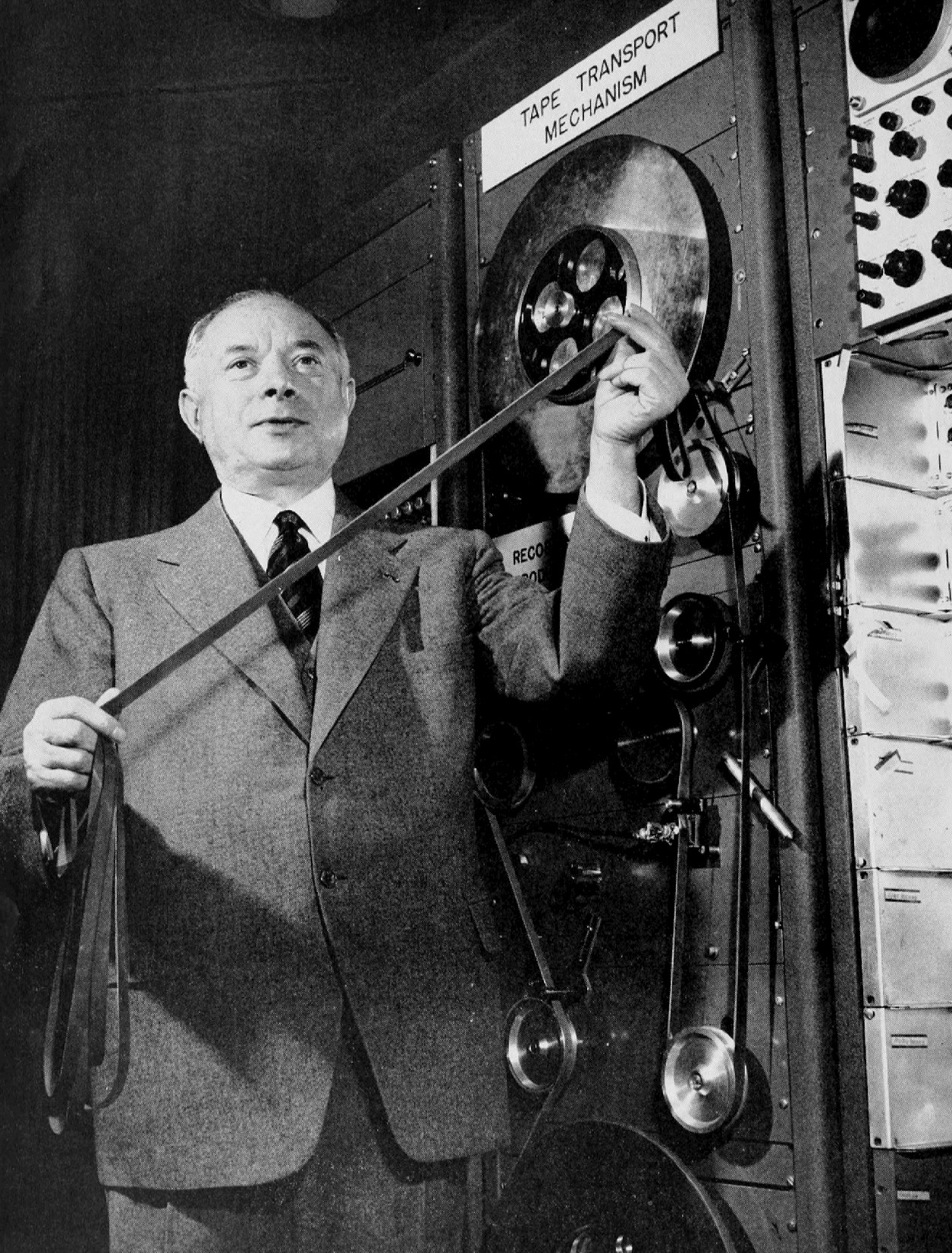
David Sarnoff with the first RCA videotape machine in 1954

To date, two historic technology developments among many that took place at RCA Laboratories have been recognized by the IEEE History Center Milestone Program. The IEEE Milestones in Electrical Engineering and Computing program honors significant technical achievements in areas associated with IEEE. These two are the 1946–1953 invention of Monochrome-Compatible Electronic Color Television and the 1968 invention of the Liquid Crystal Display.

Beginning in the 1940s, key aspects of thin-film technology were developed at the RCA Laboratories. Thin-film technology, including evaporation of thin metal and dielectric materials in a vacuum to coat a surface, was first developed intensively for photoemissive surfaces required for television camera technologies under development at RCA since the 1930s. It was later applied to semiconductor-fabrication process development leading, in part, to the historic growth of solid-state electronics.

In the mid-1950s, while working at the RCA Laboratories, Herbert Kroemer developed key aspects of his theories of heterostructure physics for which he was a co-recipient of the Nobel Prize in Physics.

Other pioneering and historic technology developments attributable to the RCA Laboratories and Sarnoff Corporation's David Sarnoff Research Center include development of the electron microscope, the photon-counting photomultiplier, the CCD imager, CMOS integrated circuit technology, and early optoelectronic components such as lasers and LEDs.

== Corporate history ==
Although the facility existed under the name David Sarnoff Research Center for many years, Sarnoff Corporation was only created as an independently operating business following the purchase by General Electric (GE) of RCA in the late 1980s. The context was RCA's write-off of hundreds of millions of dollars of investment in capacitive-pickup videodisc technology. RCA's SelectaVision offering was overtaken by the videocassette recorder, which allowed recording in addition to playback offered by Selectavision disks. This 1983 product failure affected RCA stock at a time when equities markets were advancing strongly, thus paving the way for a GE takeover.

In the deal, in which GE gained ownership of NBC, RCA was broken up. GE's Jack Welch disposed of diverse RCA operating businesses. Lockheed Martin acquired RCA's government systems unit in the Philadelphia area. Harris Corporation acquired RCA's semiconductor division, located along Route 202 in New Jersey. Thomson SA, the French company, acquired RCA's consumer electronics division with manufacturing activities in Indianapolis, IN, and Lancaster, PA. Regarding the RCA David Sarnoff Research Center, GE did not require an augmentation of GE labs in Schenectady and Syracuse, NY. In the regional community, interest was expressed in establishing an east-coast "Silicon Valley", in which the Princeton, NJ, David Sarnoff Research Center could play a role.

A late-1950s antitrust consent decree had required RCA to provide low-cost licenses for consumer electronics technology, largely television-related, to domestic U.S. competitors. RCA had, however, monetized its intellectual property by selling additional licenses internationally. The David Sarnoff Research Center had continued to provide support to clients to further the inventions described in these patents, and GE wished to maintain these activities of the David Sarnoff Research Center to service the very considerable sizable licensing activity that it acquired along with RCA.

To address this need, GE engaged non-profit SRI International as an independent third party. Ultimately, in 1986, GE accepted an SRI International proposal that it acquire the David Sarnoff Research Center by donation, along with sufficient operating funds to maintain the activity for several years. In fact, the patent licensing revenues associated with RCA television technologies significantly exceeded operating costs. GE retained the excess and the David Sarnoff Research Center continued to support the licenses and ensured they maintained their value. A provision of the divestiture was that, should the organization not be profitable five years after it was emancipated from GE, its land (nearly 300 acres (1.2 km^{2}) of valuable property) would revert to GE. Sarnoff was able to attain profitability and the deed was transferred to Sarnoff Corporation around 1995.

A sizable part of the workforce was reduced by a layoff during the Dot Com Bust that reduced the amount of venture capital available; the company had 800 employees in 2001, and 540 in 2006. On January 3, 2011, Sarnoff Corporation merged with SRI, ceasing to exist as an independent company.

== Library ==
Between 1967 and 2010, the David Sarnoff Research Center housed exhibits and archives in the David Sarnoff Library, which was constructed by RCA to display longtime RCA leader and labs namesake David Sarnoff's history. Later contributions by RCA staff and collectors highlighted pioneering electronic and broadcast radio and television innovations at RCA and its laboratories. These were owned and administered by a 501(c)(3) nonprofit board of directors. In 2009, in response to the changing missions of the company and the Library, the latter's board voted to transfer the bulk of its exhibits to The College of New Jersey, and the bulk of its archival collections to the Hagley Museum and Library in Wilmington, Delaware. Some artifacts and the RCA Broadcast Division manuals collection were transferred to the InfoAge Science/History Learning Center; some products of the RCA Victor Division in Camden, New Jersey, were transferred to the Camden County Historical Society; and a 1946 RCA Victor 630-TS was transferred to the New Jersey State Museum.
