= Electronic disk (disambiguation) =

Electronic disk may refer to:

- Solid-state drive, a data storage device functionally similar to a hard disk drive but using flash memory
- Capacitance Electronic Disc, an obsolete consumer video playback format developed by RCA
- Television Electronic Disc, a discontinued video recording format
