= RCA video =

RCA video may refer to any video standards using RCA connectors.

- Composite video (the most common standard referred to as "RCA video"
  - S-Video, some renditions of this standard utilize 2 RCA ports (luma and chroma), of which are only "half" of composite video with provisions for less crosstalk.
  - Component video, uses three "red" (Pb), "green" (Y) and "blue" (Pr) RCA ports; of which this standard also derives from the composite video standard too.
- Selectavision, or Capacitance Electronic Disc; RCA's obscure video format
