= Dimentia =

Dimentia may be a misspelling of:

- RCA Dimensia, a high-end TV produced in the 1980s.
- Dementia, a condition associated with the decline of cognitive ability.

== See also ==
- Dementia (disambiguation).
