= Phonovision =

Attempt to record mechanical television on gramophone records

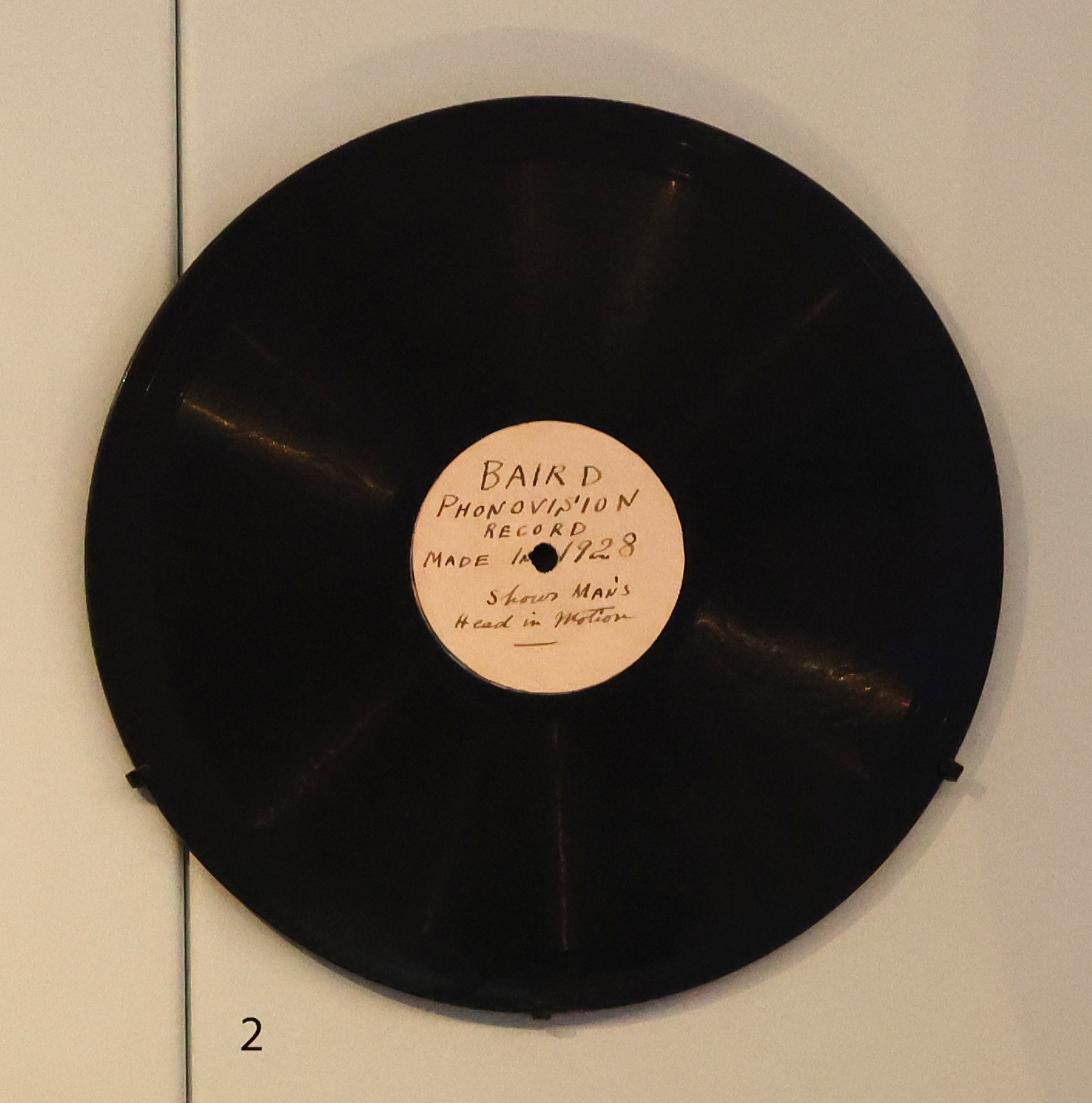
A Phonovision record

Phonovision was a patented concept to create pre-recorded mechanically scanned television recordings on gramophone records. Attempts at developing Phonovision were undertaken in the late 1920s in London by its inventor, Scottish television pioneer John Logie Baird. The objective was not simply to record video, but to record it synchronously, as Baird intended playback from an inexpensive playback device, which he called a 'Phonovisor'. Baird stated that he had several records made of the sound of the vision signal but that the quality was poor. Unlike Baird's other experiments (including stereoscopy, colour and infra-red night-vision), there is no evidence of him having demonstrated playback of pictures, though he did play back the sound of the vision signal to audiences. Baird moved on leaving behind several discs in the hands of museums and favoured company members. Until 1982, this was the extent of knowledge regarding Phonovision.

== Discoveries and restoration ==
From 1982, Donald F. McLean undertook a forensic-level investigation that identified a total of five different disc recordings dated 1927-28 that closely aligned with the principles of Baird's Phonovision patents. In addition, study of the distortions in the recordings led to a new understanding of the mechanical problems Baird had encountered, explaining why these discs were never good enough for picture playback. The problems were largely corrected by software, and the resultant images project a far better quality image than what would have been seen in Baird's laboratories at the time.

Despite its technical problems, Phonovision remains the very earliest means of recording a television signal. In a sense, it can be seen as the progenitor of other disc-based systems, such as the German TelDec system of the early 1970s and the USA's Capacitance Electronic Disc, also known as SelectaVision.

== The Experimental Phonovision Discs (1927-28) ==
The earliest surviving Phonovision disc depicts one of the dummy heads that Baird employed for tests. It was recorded on 20 September 1927 and most likely was used during tests prior to Baird's trans-Atlantic television demonstration in February 1928. This disc and the surviving documentation from that demonstration are held at the University of Glasgow Archives and Special Collections.

The Phonovision recordings of 10 January 1928 reveal the earliest recording of a human face identified as one of Baird's staff, Wally Fowlkes. On 28 March 1928, a recording labelled 'Miss Pounsford' was made which is, in many ways, the best of the experimental discs. In the 1990s, her relatives identified her as Mabel Pounsford, who had always claimed that she had been a secretary working for J L Baird.

== Recordings from the BBC 30-line Television Service (1932-35) ==
Baird's experimental discs are not the only such video recordings that have survived. In April 1933, an early television enthusiast used a Silvatone home sound recording outfit that indented a signal-modulated groove into a bare aluminium disc thereby capturing the video signal from a BBC 30-line 12.5 frames per second live broadcast. This disc preserves about four minutes of video without the corresponding audio from what McLean identified as the BBC programme Looking In. This was advertised by the BBC as 'the world's first television revue'. McLean digitally recovered the televised image, revealing a high level of production values that belies the conventional wisdom that all mechanical television programming was very simple and static and offered little entertainment value.

Several other undated domestic recordings of 30-line television were discovered in 1998 and show high quality 30-line television (most likely from the BBC 30-line Television Service) of singers that include one recognised by Betty Bolton as being herself.

A comprehensive history of the recovery of Phonovision as well as the domestic recordings of the vision signal from the BBC 30-line television service was published in 2000.
