= Dementia (disambiguation) =

Dementia is a cognitive disorder.

Dementia may also refer to:

- Dementia (1955 film), a low-budget horror film made in 1953 and released in 1955
- Dementia (2014 film), a 2014 Filipino horror film
- Dementia (2015 film), a 2015 film directed by Mike Testin
- Dementia (journal), an academic journal established in 2002 covering research on the disorder
- Armed & Delirious, a 1997 video game released as Dementia in Europe
- Dementia, a female wrestler from the Gorgeous Ladies of Wrestling
- Dementia, one of the two kingdoms in the 2007 role-playing game The Elder Scrolls IV: Shivering Isles
- "Dementia", a song by Cupcakke from Dauntless Manifesto, 2024
- "Dementia", a song by Erra from Augment, 2013
- "Dementia", a song by Owl City featuring Mark Hoppus from The Midsummer Station, 2-12
- Music played by Dr. Demento

== Also ==
- Dimensia, a line of high-end TVs made under RCA
