= Digital Command Center =

1980's RCA remote control

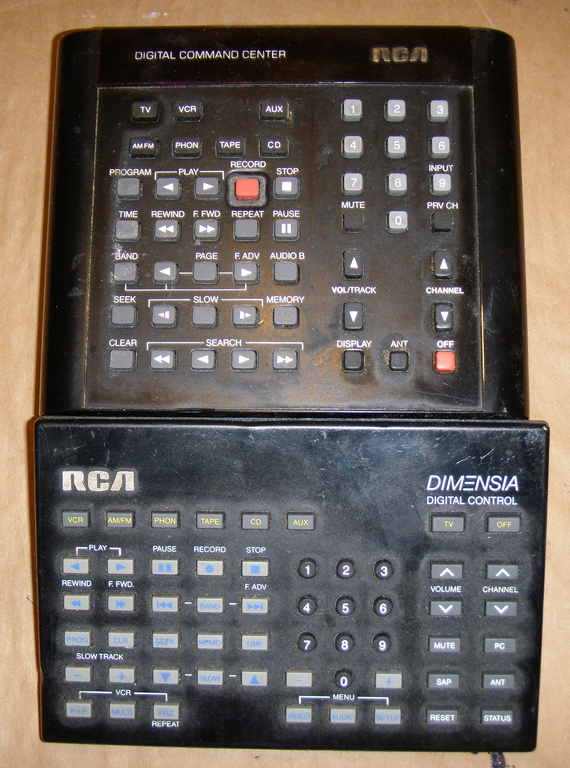
Digital Command Center and the Dimensia Digital Control

The Digital Command Center was a very large remote control introduced for RCA's high-end television sets; in 1983 for the Colortrak 2000 and the SJT400 CED player and in 1984 for the Dimensia Lyceum TV sets. The main feature of the Digital Command Center was that it was universal amongst many RCA-brand entertainment systems on top of controlling the monitor itself. The Digital Command Center took four AA batteries to power, due to its extensive and ahead-of-its time functionality. Two variations of the remote were made; the initial 1983 version was a stainless steel metallic color and only had the ability to control the video monitor, VCR, and CED player sold with the Digital Command line; the 1984 version of the remote was black and now had the ability to also control RCA Dimensia stereo systems, CD players, cassette players and record players (while simultaneously removing the CED player button as the device was cancelled for the 1984 fiscal year).

The initial Digital Command Center released in 1983 with the Dimensia system, the CRK35A, had 47 buttons, had onboard memory, and weighed nearly a pound with its batteries; the 1984 remote would have 52 buttons in total.

In 1985, RCA released the Digital Command Component System, an all audio system that was compatible with all Dimensia audio components, which also used the Digital Command Center remote. The idea of this system was to have the full functionality of the Dimensia's sound system without the need of a Dimensia monitor.

== Dimensia systems ==
In Dimensia television systems, the remote was called Dimensia Intelligent Audio Video or Dimensia Digital Control because all of the components were integrated so that the remote could activate the entire system with the touch of one button by communicating with the built-in computer found in the Dimensia monitor via the black control jack found on all Dimensia components. This remote had 8 device keys on it; TV, VCR, VID2 (DISC), AUX, AM/FM, PHON, TAPE, and CD. Since the CED Player intended to be released with the Dimensia system in 1984 was cancelled, the VID2 button and the ability to control the CED Players was absent from later remotes.

The Dimensia Intelligent Audio Video was replaced with a wedge-shaped remote (CRK45A) in 1987.
