= XL-100 =

Model of a television

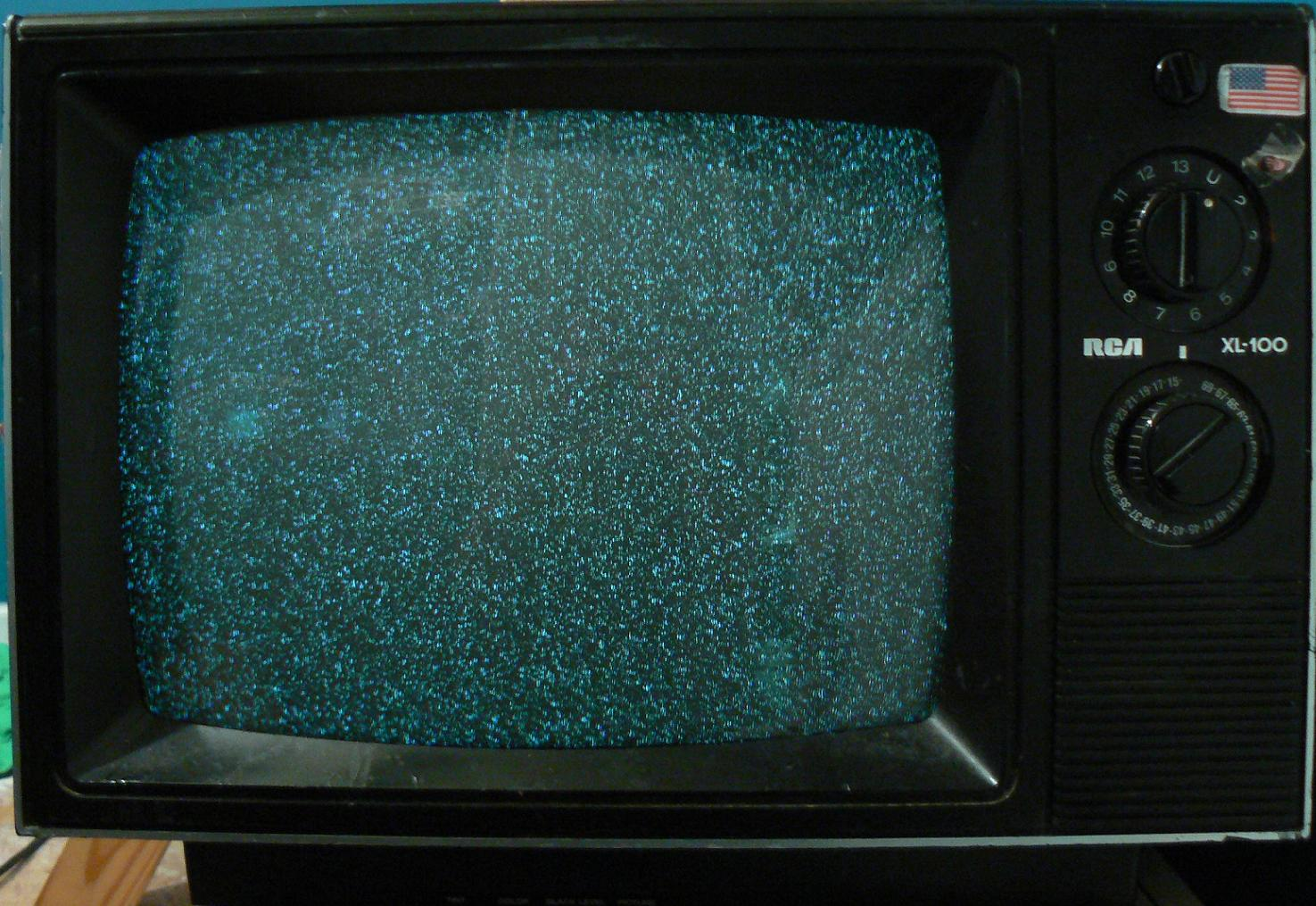
RCA XL-100

The XL-100 was a line of solid-state television sets introduced by RCA in 1971. The "XL" stands for extended life chassis while the 100 refers to RCA's emphasis of 100% solid-state chassis. Initially the top-of-the-line RCA color televisions, they would become lower-end as the Colortrak and Dimensia series were introduced (in the mid-1970s and early 1980s, respectively) The original models replaced the RCA "Vista" and "New Vista" color television series. The XL 100 name was discontinued in the late 1990s.

== Expansion of RCA model lines based on the XL-100 chassis ==
During later model years, the XL-100 line became the middle and then lower-priced color televisions in the RCA lineup. RCA introduced the "Colortrak" in 1976 and toward the end of analog television, the "Dimensia" lines in the mid 1980s. In later years, all three TV lines used the same RCA CTC-xxx (CTC is RCA's acronym for Color TV Chassis) chassis and the main differences were in cabinet design and electronic features. The evolution of XL-100 to Colortrak is featured in a 1976 magazine advertisement and at the end RCA introduces the "Colortrak" as "XL-100 Colortrak", RCA also launched TV commercials touting XL-100 Colortrak.

Towards the end of its availability, XL-100 had been downgraded to a basic television with few features. When color TVs began providing video inputs and other features, XL-100 models in the late 1980s often had only a standard 75 ohm unbalanced dipole coaxial cable input. Higher-end XL-100 models in the 1980s had a digital keypad and a digital channel indicator, but did not have remote capabilities, while the lower XL-100 sets had basic rotary dial tuners. The models sold in the early 1990s also had RCA jacks for composite video and stereo audio input accessed by tuning the TV to channel 91 and console models had remote control operation.
