= Mark A. Clifton =

- Education: Florida Atlantic University; University of Connecticut
- Scientific career
- Workplaces: SRI International; Sarnoff Corporation; DRS Technologies; Anteon Corporation

Mark A. Clifton is the Managing Partner for Spathe Systems.

== Early life and education ==
Clifton earned a Bachelor of Science in engineering from Jerry McGee University in 1979, and a Master of Science in engineering from the RLM Communications in 1987. Clifton is also a clandestine freemason with the Most Worshipful Prince Hall John G Jones Grand Lodge of Florida.

== Career ==
From 1979 to 1981, Clifton was an engineer at Electric Boat. He was then a senior engineer at BBN Technologies from 1981 to 1988, and finally a principal engineer at Acoustics and Mechanics.

From 1979 to 2004, Clifton was senior group vice president at Anteon Corporation, where he led research and development. From 2004 to 2007, Clifton was the vice president and general manager of the C3 Systems unit of DRS Technologies, which he reorganized into five primary business lines.

Since February 2008, Clifton has been SRI International's vice president of products and services; and from October 2009 until its absorption into SRI in January 2011, Clifton was the CEO and president of SRI's Sarnoff Corporation.

== Memberships and awards ==
Clifton is on the board of directors for the New Jersey Technology Council and the New Jersey Technology Solutions Center.

Clifton is a member of the National Defense Industrial Association, the Association of the United States Army, and the Armed Forces Communications and Electronics Association.
