= ProScan =

Consumer electronics manufacturer

Proscan
- Company type: Private
- Industry: Consumer electronics
- Founded: 1990; 36 years ago
- Parent: Established Inc.
- Website: www.proscan-brand.com/en-US/index.html

ProScan is a consumer electronics manufacturer and has a trademark in continuous use since 1990. It is previously one brand of the French company Technicolor SA (previously named Thomson SA) with products competing with higher-end electronics. The ProScan name is owned by Technicolor USA, Inc (previously named Thomson Consumer Electronics). The company created television and video products to compete with Sony's Trinitron XBR, Pioneer's Elite, and other electronics brand lines. Competition is focused mainly on price to size ratio. The tagline for ProScan is "So advanced, yet so simple."

Once the premium sub-brand of RCA TVs, the ProScan name is owned by Technicolor, which controls RCA as well. The brand is currently licensed in North America by Curtis International, an Ontario, Canada, manufacturer and distributor of value-based consumer electronics products. Established inc. acquired the brand rights in 2025.

== History ==
The ProScan brand superseded the RCA Dimensia line in the early 1990s after the purchase of RCA by General Electric and lasted into the early 2000s until it was dropped for the RCA Scenium brand. Thomson SA has never manufactured or distributed televisions in the United States labeled Thomson. In 2006, Thomson Consumer Electronics licensed the Proscan name to ON corporation, although they retain ownership of the name and logotype. Electronics are under the brand used by Curtis International. Formally made by OnCorp, then ActiveON, ProScan was made by Curtis International from 2011 until 2019.
