= Lyceum TV =

Electronic device

The RCA Lyceum TV was a commercial monitor/receiver with a large input/output panel on the back, and a 20-foot (6.1 m) long grounded plug. During the mid-80s, RCA released the Colortrak 2000, a television identical to the Dimensia table-top model. Even though the Colortrak was considered the mid-range model, those bearing the name Colortrak 2000, were considered high-end, along with the Dimensia. The Lyceum TV, Dimensia, and Colortrak 2000 models all basically had the same chassis (a wood grain veneer, or black laminate for some Dimensias, and fabric covered speakers on the sides of the cabinet).

Many Colortrak 2000, Lyceum, and Dimensia TVs came packaged with a very large remote control, the Digital Command Center. There are several different versions of the Digital Command Center, but a main feature was that it could control an array of selected RCA components, all with the one remote – a universal remote only for RCA products, so to speak. The Dimensia version of the remote was called the "Dimensia-Intelligent Audio Video" and had identical buttons to the Digital Command Center.
