= Teldec =

German record label

- Parent company: Warner Music Group (formerly Telefunken and Decca Records)
- Founded: 1950; 76 years ago
- Genre: Classical music (Early and Baroque music)
- Country of origin: Germany
- Location: Hamburg
- Official website: www.warnerclassics.com

Teldec (Telefunken-Decca Schallplatten GmbH) is a German record label in Hamburg, Germany. Today the label is a property of Warner Music Group.

== History ==
Teldec was a producer of (first) shellac and (later) vinyl records. The Teldec manufacturing facility was located in Nortorf near Kiel in Germany. The company was founded in 1950 as a co-operation between Telefunken and Decca Records. The name Teldec is the result of taking the first three letters of both labels: Telefunken and Decca. Records manufactured by Teldec mostly were released under the Telefunken or Decca label, but normally these records contained no hint that they were made by Teldec. In 1983, Telefunken and Decca pulled out of Teldec and in 1988 Teldec was sold to Time Warner. In 1997, the remaining compact-disc production facility in Nortorf was to be closed by Time Warner, but after a management buyout, the new company OK Media, continued CD production. In 2001, after the merger of AOL & Time Warner, Teldec closed.

=== TeD video disc ===
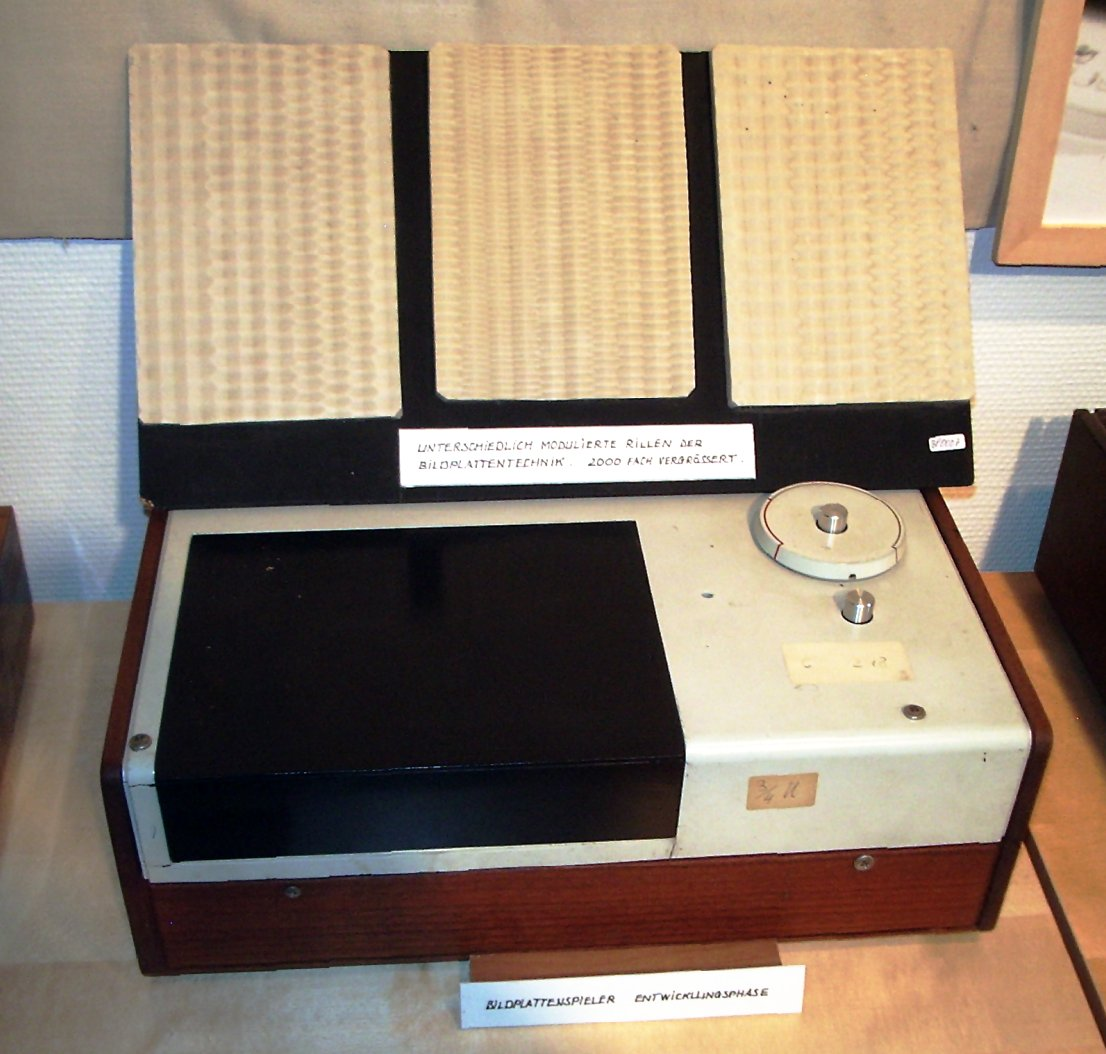
Design prototype of a player for the Telefunken TeD video disc

In the early 1970s, Teldec was acting for Telefunken in the development of a disc manufacturing technology for Telefunken's "TeD" video disc player TD1005, released in 1975. The Television Electronic Disc (TeD) system was more or less a predecessor of the more successful optical Philips LaserDisc video system, as the TeD system employed the idea of using FM instead of AM for storing the video signal on a disc for the first time.

The TeD video-disc player used a piezo-electric pick-up cartridge with a diamond stylus, mechanically sampling the frequency-modulated, PAL-encoded audio-video signal from thousands of concentric grooves, vertically recorded into the surface of a very thin, flexible vinyl disc. The disc was freely rotating on a thin cushion of air between the disc and a fixed plate at 1500rpm (25 Hz), the disc being stabilized only by centrifugal force. The sampling frequency of the combined audio-video signal was about 2.7 MHz. Maximum video playing time was ten minutes on a 210 mm disc, amounting to about 15,000 concentric grooves on the disc, each storing two half-frame PAL-video-lines.

=== Direct Metal Mastering ===
A technological spin-off from the short-lived TeD video system was Teldec's Direct Metal Mastering technology, called DMM, for the manufacturing of vinyl records: The cutting lathe engraves and impresses the audio signal (via Blumlein stereo cutting) in the copper-plated mother disk, instead of in the lacquer coating on an aluminium 'grandmother' disk. This bypasses the need to electroform a father disk, firstly, and reputed allowed better retention of the modulated signals in the groove due to the copper phase not possessing the strong elastic memory of the lacquer coating on traditional blank disks.

== Record label ==
Teldec / Telefunken issued recordings via its own record label from the 1950s. Classical recordings included performances by the Bamberg Symphony Orchestra, Berlin Symphony Orchestra, Berlin Philharmonic, Hamburg State Philharmonic Orchestra, and from elsewhere in Europe, such as the Orchestre symphonique de la Radiodiffusion Nationale Belge. The conductors under contract included Joseph Keilberth, Artur Rother, Belgian conductor Franz André and the German electronic organist/pianist Klaus Wunderlich who recorded solo Hammond organ recordings and early Moog synthesizer recordings (whilst recording for Teldec he earned 13 gold discs). The American violinist Joan Field recorded, for Telefunken, the violin concertos of Bruch, Dvorak, Mendelssohn, Mozart and Spohr. A project of the 1980s was the first recording of the original versions of the symphonies of Anton Bruckner with the Frankfurt Radio Symphony conducted by Eliahu Inbal.

=== Das Alte Werk ===
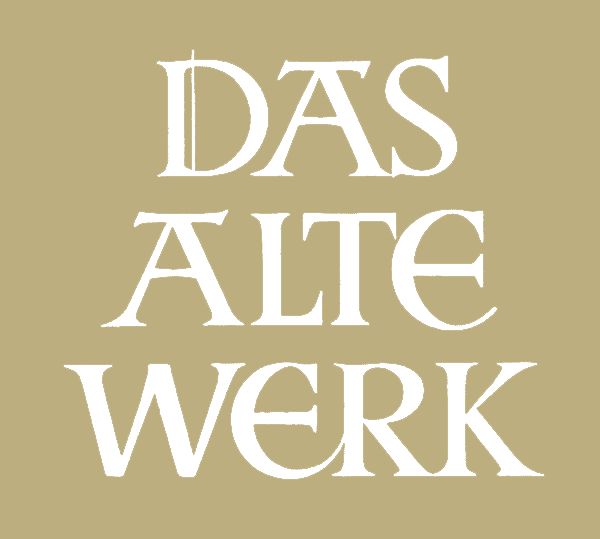
Teldec's label Das Alte Werk specialises in early music.

A feature of the Teldec catalogue was its coverage of early music and promotion of Historically informed performances, which were marketed from 1958 under its own sub-label Das Alte Werk. The first significant recordings were by Nikolaus Harnoncourt and his Concentus Musicus Wien, then later also with other orchestras, who became one of the main artists of the label. Teldec's largest project in this area was the prize-winning complete recording of Bach cantatas, which were recorded from 1970–1989 jointly by the Concentus Musicus Wien conducted by Nikolaus Harnoncourt and by the Leonhardt-Consort with Gustav Leonhardt. Teldec did not however achieve the distinction of completing the first set of these works, losing to the rival series by Hänssler Classic on conventional modern instruments by Helmuth Rilling. (This started later in 1975 but managed to meet Teldec's original 1985 Bach tercentary year deadline for completion). Das Alte Werk also produced the first recordings of reconstructed versions of Monteverdi's operas L'Orfeo, Il ritorno d'Ulisse in patria and L'incoronazione di Poppea in a Zurich Opera cycle under Harnoncourt. In the 1990s Das Alte Werk recorded a few newer artists such as the ensembles Tragicomedia and Chanticleer, but effectively ceased new projects after Teldec's acquisition by Warner Classics.
