= Dementia (journal) =

- Discipline: Dementia care, dementia studies
- Language: English
- Edited by: Pamela Roach, Caroline Swarbrick

Publication details
- History: 2002-present
- Publisher: SAGE Publications
- Frequency: Bimonthly
- Impact factor: 2.238

Standard abbreviations
- ISO 4: Dementia

Indexing
- ISSN: 1471-3012 (print); 1741-2684 (web)
- LCCN: 2002248423
- OCLC no.: 635352195

Links
- Journal homepage; Online access; Online archive

Dementia: The International Journal of Social Research and Practice is a bimonthly peer-reviewed academic journal that covers research in the field of dementia studies. Its editors-in-chief are Dr. Pamela Roach (University of Calgary) and Dr. Caroline Swarbrick (University of Lancaster) . It was established in 2002 and is currently published by SAGE Publications.

== Abstracting and indexing ==
The journal is abstracted and indexed in:

- Academic Search Premier
- Applied Social Sciences Index & Abstracts
- Current Contents/Social & Behavioral Sciences
- Social Sciences Citation Index
- Scopus
