= Component television =

Television set form factor

Component television is a form factor in which a television set is sold as a system of separate components, similar to audio components. For example, a component television system is a monitor, tuner and speakers sold separately and which can be integrated into a single system. The component television form factor began in 1980 (but became notable in 1982) with Sony's ProFeel television line and became a design fad with many manufacturers until the late 1980s.
