= Electronic Video Recording =

Film-based format for television broadcasts, invented by CBS

Electronic Video Recording, or EVR, was a film-based video recording format developed by Hungarian-born engineer Peter Carl Goldmark at CBS Laboratories in the 1960s. Intended to be used primarily for educational and household use as a method of storing large amounts of videos and papers without taking up as much space as other media forms.

CBS announced the development of EVR on August 27, 1967. The 750-foot film was stored on a 7-inch-diameter (180 mm) spool in a plastic cartridge. It used a twin-track 8.75 mm film onto which video signals were transferred by electron beam recording, two monochrome tracks in the same direction of travel. Some EVR films had a separate chroma track in place of the second program monochrome track for color EVR films. The images stored on an EVR film were visible frames much like motion picture film, and were read by a flying-spot scanner inside an EVR player to be converted to a video signal to be sent to a television set.

CBS purchased 1,500 old 20th Century Fox movies to sell on EVR, and licensed other productions from BBC and Mondadori. EVR was also released by CBS as a professional version for television broadcasting, called BEVR (Broadcast EVR). As a professional medium, the format offered extremely high quality. It was, however, quickly superseded by professional and consumer magnetic tape formats.

== Applications ==
In 1970, EVR was briefly experimented with as a form of media for part of a potential US government mixed media network system

In 1975, Nintendo created EVR Race, a horse betting arcade game that used the EVR system to play back video footage of animated horse races. Players would place bets on horses, and then view a race in which one of the horses would win. Once the race ended, the player(s) who bet on the winning horse would receive a payout. EVR Race was Japan's highest-grossing medal game for three years in a row, from 1976 to 1978.
