= Video High Density =

Videodisk format

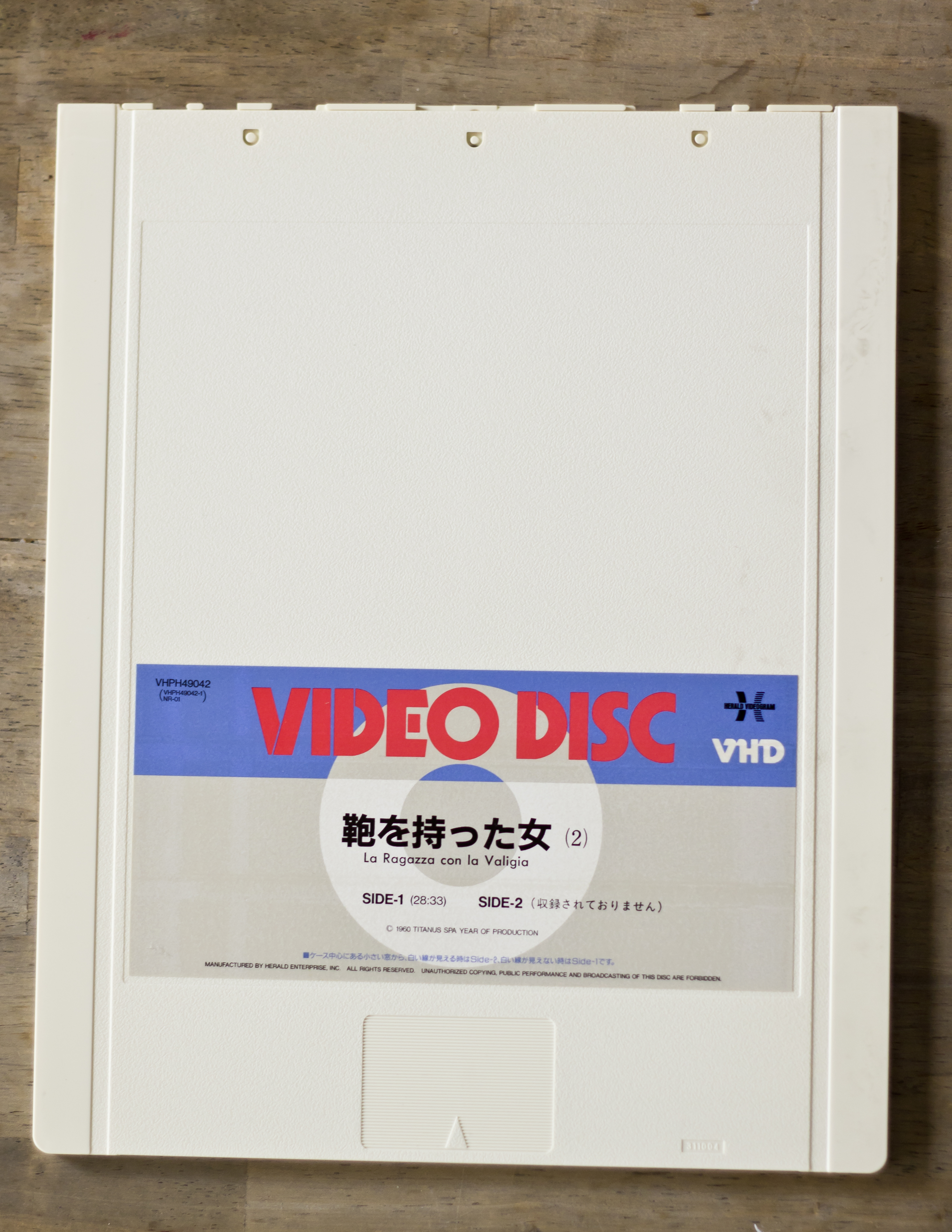
- A VHD disc; pictured is a copy of the 1961 Italian film "Girl With a Suitcase"
- Media type: video playback media
- Capacity: 60 minutes NTSC video per side
- Read mechanism: stylus
- Usage: Home video
- Released: 1983

Video High Density (VHD) was an analog video disc format storing up to 60 minutes per side, predominantly marketed by JVC in Japan. In contrast to the optical LaserDisc format, the VHD format was read with a physical conductive stylus. Facing numerous competing formats both in and outside of Japan, the reach of VHD remained very limited.

== History ==
VHD was first demonstrated in 1978 and was eventually released in Japan on April 21, 1983. Despite demonstrating the player at several Consumer Electronics Shows, JVC opted not to release VHD as a consumer product in North America.

In the UK, Thorn EMI, which was the leading consumer provider of the VHS tape system, saw VHD as the next step in the market and committed to the system. In 1981 it invested in a factory to press discs (in Swindon) and a production unit to develop a catalogue of "interactive" titles to support a planned 1984 launch, but canceled the investment in late 1983. VHD remained on the market in the UK primarily as an educational and training tool, usually linked to a computer, but attracted few customers.

It found its main niche as a karaoke system, and was also used in video games and interactive training systems. Commercial versions were available in the UK for training, demonstration and fault diagnosis.

A stereoscopic system was also sold in Japan. These 3D VHD systems achieved the 3D effect using double-speed discs with alternate-eye images and LCS glasses to pass the correct view to each eye.

While discs continued to be manufactured in the 1980s, the format saw its last new release in 1990.

== Technology ==
VHD discs are 25 centimetres (9.8 in) in diameter, and store up to 60 minutes of video per side. As with CED, each disc is stored in a caddy: the user never handles the disc directly. The entire caddy is inserted into the player, and then withdrawn, leaving the disc inside where it will be loaded and start playing. At the end of the side the disc must be removed, turned over and re-inserted.

Like the RCA CED system, the signal is recorded on the discs as variations in capacitance, a conductive coating on the disc itself forming part of a resonant circuit. A diamond stylus reads the signal, though unlike CED there are no actual grooves – the stylus follows the tracks electronically, like a compact disc. This means less wear, though there is still physical contact (unlike LaserDisc) so some wear would still occur. Signals are recorded as pits, similarly to laserdisc, at lower cost at the time since a laser is not needed to read the disc. The stylus was made of diamond and a laser and a furnace was used to create a conductive layer on the stylus and the diamond sits on a ceramic support, which comprises the stylus.

The discs contain two frames (four fields) per revolution, and play in CAV mode, which makes play simple, as all frames start at the same place on the disc, but having two frames per rotation means that true freeze frame is not possible. There would be some "jitter" on moving sequences (discs which were designed to be used a frame at a time – such as picture catalogues – doubled up the frames, to get true stills at the cost of reduced capacity).

The VHD system had advantages over both CED and LaserDisc. In active (CAV) mode (not available in CED) it had a greater capacity than LaserDisc. It also had the ability to carry 99 randomly accessible 'chapters' (more than LaserDisc) and had the same autostop capability. These two functions had to be programmed into the master tape from which the videodisc was made, along with the two-frame freeze frame function. This made videotape master editing a highly specialized operation requiring precise insertion of vertical interval codes into the video signal, and field accurate editing (most videotape editing required only frame accuracy).

VHD was always intended as a highly interactive format, and many non-linear 'trick-play' features were supported, directly by the players or via an optional VHDpc computer interface for the MSX and Sharp X1 computers.

== Uses ==
Applications included interactive adventure games, and car engine diagnostic tools. Constructing an interactive disc required a lot of planning as well as the specialist video master editing. The costs entailed in discovering these complexities and solving the problems, as well as recognizing that the video post-production technology of the time was being pushed to its limits probably contributed to the decision to withdraw the system.

== Offshoots ==
There was also a digital audio-only variant, Audio High Density (AHD; not released/canceled).
