= RCA Dimensia =

Brand of televisions

Dimensia (/dɪˈmɛnsiə/ dih-MEN-see-uh) was RCA's brand name for their high-end models of television systems and their components (tuner, VCR, CD player, etc.) produced from 1984 to 1989, with variations continuing into the early 1990s, superseded by the ProScan model line. After RCA was acquired by General Electric in 1986, GE sold the RCA consumer electronics line to Thomson SA which continued the Dimensia line. They are significant for their wide array of advanced features and for being the first television receiver systems to feature a built in computer, somewhat of an early incarnation of a smart TV, but without internet access (see Technological convergence). In 1985, RCA released the Digital Command Component System, a fully integrated audio system that permitted the full functionality of Dimensia audio components without a Dimensia monitor. The name "Dimensia" actually dates back to the early 1970s when RCA used the term for an enhanced spatial stereo effect which they called "Dimensia IV". The tagline for the Dimensia was The Next Dimension in Sight and Sound.

== Features ==
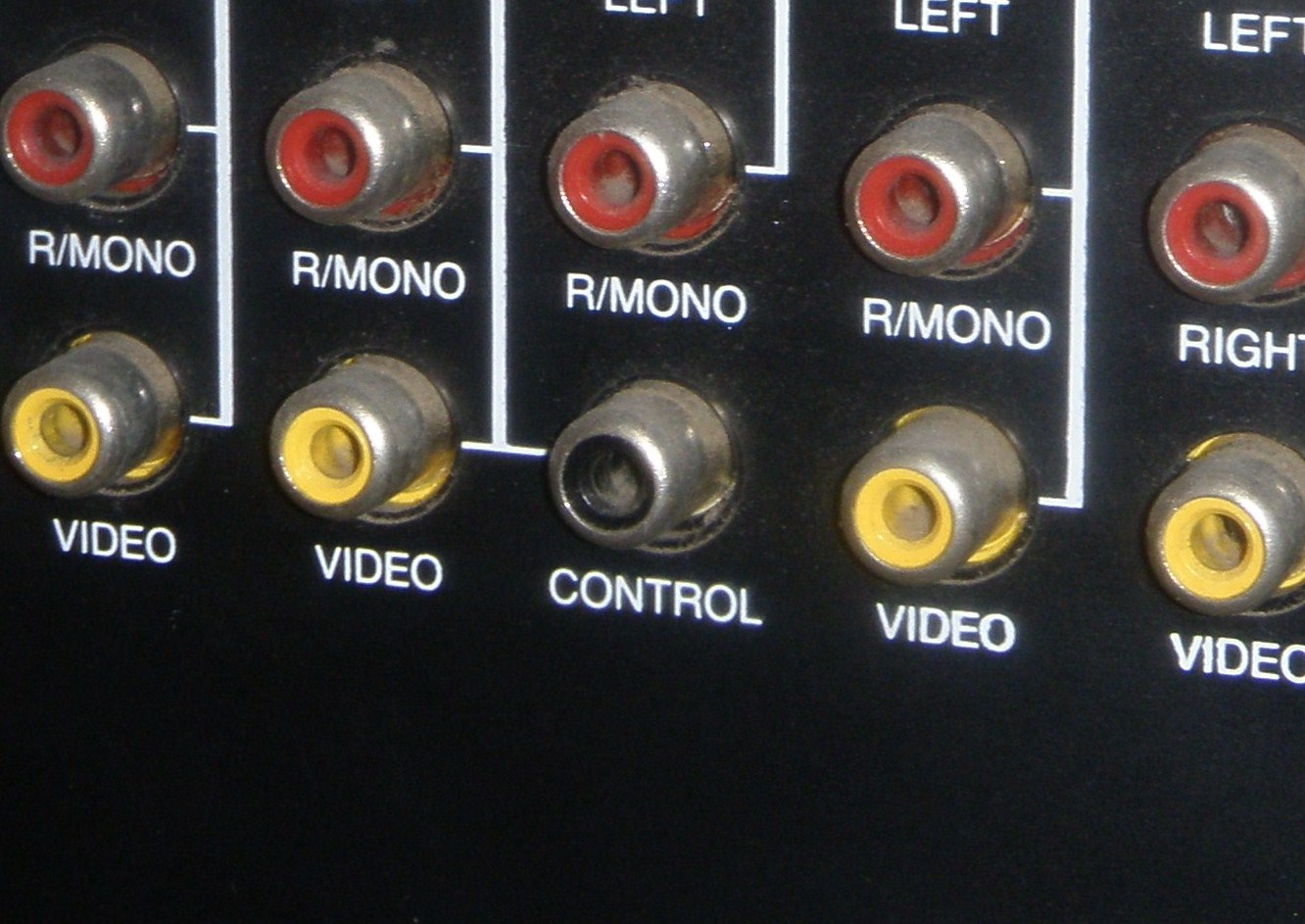
Control bus used to connect all the components to the computer in the TV

The RCA Dimensia systems had a wide array of high-end features that were novel for its time and are still not common anywhere.

=== Computer ===
The main unique feature of the Dimensia system was the MRT 003, a 32-kilobyte built-in computer module which allowed the monitor to communicate with all Dimensia components and the remote functions. All components were connected via the control bus found on the I/O panel on the back of the TV. The control bus was a unique RCA connector which was colored black. All Dimensia branded components had this control jack and they all interconnected by using RCA plugs that could piggy-back, resulting in a daisy chain which simplified wiring. This was known as the SystemLink, a communication system that had 16 kilobytes of computer memory (after the discontinuation of the Dimensia product line, RCA reused the SystemLink term for their universal remotes).

=== Input/Output ===
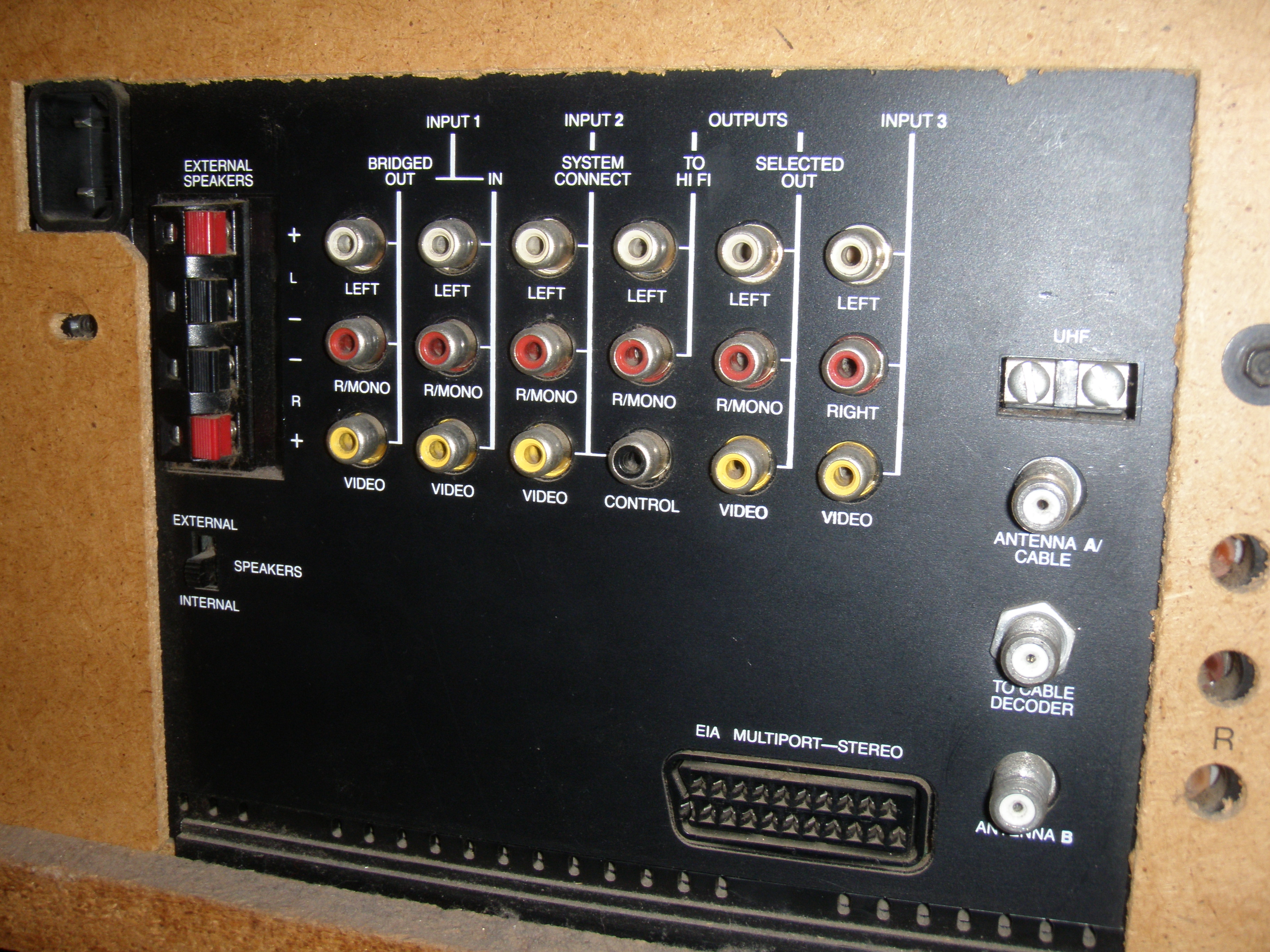
I/O panel of the Dimensia console TV

One of the main features of the Dimensia's was the large input/output panel on the back. This included several RCA composite video terminals as well as multiple unbalanced and balanced RF antenna/cable inputs. This enabled easy connection of all Dimensia system components, each on their own channel. Additionally, the RCA cables were able to be connected piggy-back, resulting in daisy-chain wiring. The components were also connected to the control bus data link via the same piggy-back style RCA connectors. All Dimensia-Intelligent components could interact with the monitor's built-in computer. The first generation console Dimensia I/O panel shown to the left also has a SCART interface, an early multiport A/V interface which was popular in Europe (called EIA Multiport-Stereo Connector by RCA).

=== Universal Remote ===
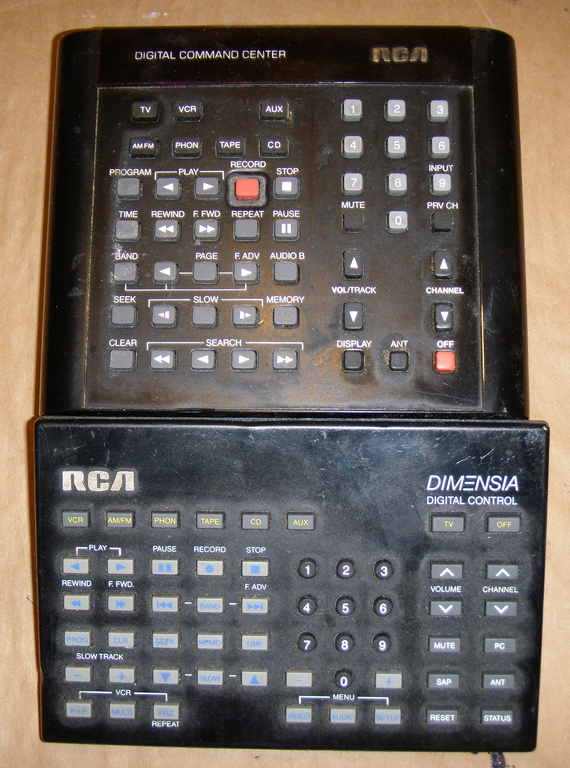
Digital Command Center and Dimensia Digital Control

The Dimensia system came with a very large and advanced universal remote, called Dimensia Intelligent Audio Video or Dimensia Digital Control, variations of the Digital Command Center. The capabilities of this remote were far more advanced than many (perhaps any) other remotes at that time. For example, with other universal remotes you can control everything separately by controlling one component at a time; one command at a time. With the Dimensia remote, just pushing the VCR button will turn on the VCR, turn on the monitor and then play the tape in the VCR, assuming there is one in the VCR.

The Dimensia remote was not programmable like most universal remotes today. It was only fully compatible with Dimensia components. These components were referred to as Dimensia Intelligent, hence the name, Dimensia Intelligent Audio Video.

=== Television ===
Dimensia televisions had many unique features that were state of the art at the time and some that are still rare today, including:

==== 1984–1986 ====
- Cable-compatible Quartz tuning
- 26" screen
- greater than 350 lines of luminance resolution
- integral contrast enhancement filter

==== 1987 features ====
- 27" screen
- Comb Filter (for better quality picture)
- Parental Control
- SAP Channel
- Automatic Light Sensor (measured ambient light in area around TV and adjusted picture and brightness automatically to match room brightness)
- Sleep Timer
- Two antenna inputs
- On-screen Time Display

=== VHS (1987) ===
- FS Tuner
- VHS Hi-Fi stereo
- Headphone Jack
- HQ VHS Picture (better than normal VHS but inferior to S-VHS)
- Slow Motion
- Timer Recording
- Ability to record one program while watching a different program at the same time (Dimensia only)
- Record both the normal stereo audio and SAP audio on the same tape

=== Dual Auto-Reverse Cassette Deck (1987) ===
- One-Touch Dubbing
- Record Mute
- Random Memory Play

=== Audio-Video Control Center (1987) ===
- Dimensia Remote Control
- Automatic switching between components (TV, VCR, turn table, CD, etc. Dimensia only)
- Manual tone controls
- 20-station memory

== Variations ==
There are different models of the Dimensia, and there were two "generations" of the console and full Dimensia systems.

=== Basic/console ===
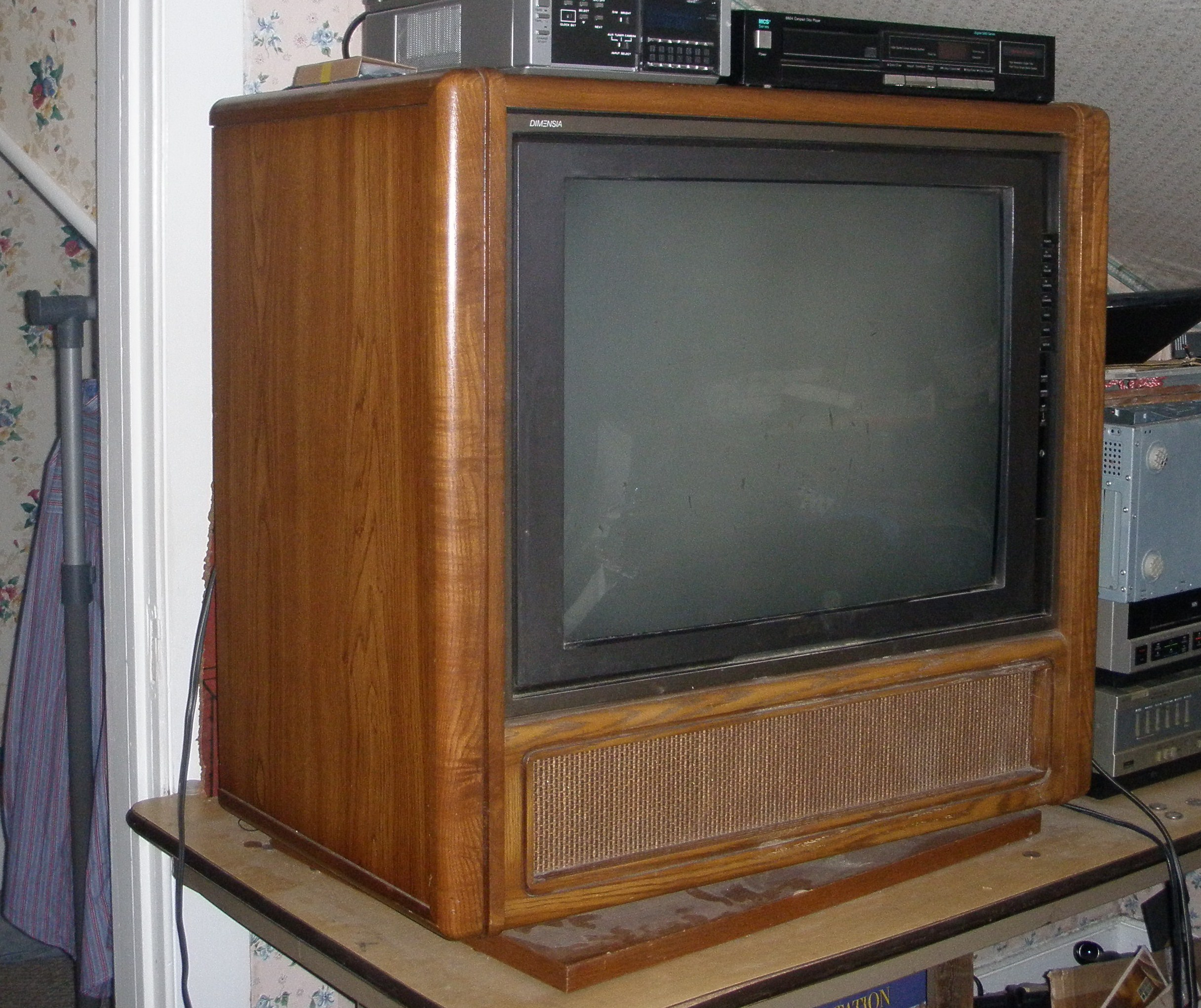
Model GPR2740T

This variation of the Dimensia featured just the TV monitor mounted in a heavy wood grain veneer with a large input/output panel. It was on a swivel mount. It was not as commercial as the monitor for the full component-based Dimensia system; however, it was still considered high-end and had the control bus. In other words, the console Dimensia system was intended to be more stand-alone television set than the full Dimensia system. The second generation console version of the Dimensia had the speakers located on the sides rather than underneath the screen (e.g., Model GPR2750P). It had three coaxial cable/antenna posts for separate RF inputs and one output.

Audio: Since the console Dimensia monitor was intended to stand alone (the full system had a 100 or 200 watt amplifier and 3-way tower speakers), but was still a high-end system, it featured a more complete built-in audio system than most monitors of the time. It had both woofers and tweeters in the TV cabinet, whereas almost all standard CRT television sets featured just one (mono) or two (stereo) low fidelity mid-range speaker drivers. It also had selectable external speaker connectors to be powered by the internal amp.

=== Commercial ===
The commercial models featured a 20-foot-long (6.1 m) grounded power cord and BNC high-end commercial coaxial inputs. These models were around before the Dimensia system and were called the RCA Lyceum TV. These units were often used in educational facilities or other institutions and had the same chassis as the Colortrak 2000 and Dimensia tabletop model (the primary one). The commercial models had many extensive features such as automatic color balance and an automatic screen brightness adjuster which varied according to the ambient light in the room; at night or with the lights off it would lower its brightness.

=== Full Dimensia system ===
Retailed at over $5,000 USD upon its release in October 1984, it came with all the matching Dimensia-intelligent components, including the VCR, CED player (canceled just before release, with the Digital Command Center remote's "DISC" button being relabeled "VID2", though some of the manuals for Dimensia components continued to show the original "DISC" button; some CED players released before the Dimensia system hit the market have the special control jack and can be used with the system), amplifier, equalizer, speakers, tuner, cassette recorder, CD player and turntable. This was the most remarkable system, as all the components were compatible with the TV's computer and almost any operation could be executed with just the push of a button on the Digital Command Center.

The two TV sets that were the center of this system (FKC2600E and FKC2601T) were physically identical to the Colortrak 2000 chassis. These monitors were where the systems 32 kilobyte microprocessors were located. They sat in a dedicated entertainment center that suited all the components of this fully integrated system. The system was available in two color schemes; a woodgrain veneer and a black exterior from 1984 to 1986. These monitors featured BTSC system three-channel audio which had just been adopted by the Federal Communications Commission as the U.S. standard for stereo television transmission in 1984, the same year as the release of Dimensia.

In 1985, RCA released a 40-inch projection monitor for the system with the 32 kilobyte microprocessors. This was otherwise identical to the 26 inch displays that were initially released.

== Sound system ==
The initial 1984 Dimensia system came with one of several three-way stereo loudspeaker systems. The first one was the SPK375 which were made to go on optional speaker stands. They were rated at 60 watts RMS and 120 watts maximum and were in a 36-pound acoustic suspension enclosure. These were initially meant to be used with the 100 watt MSA-100 amplifier; then later in 1985 the 200 watt MSA-200 amplifier was released which was compatible with the MGE-160 graphic equalizer. The impedance of the SPK-375 was six ohms and their sensitivity was 91 dB/watt/meter. The frequency response of the speakers built into the TV chassis was 50-15000 Hertz, a standard range for mid-range audio components; the external speakers and amplifiers increased this range to 35-20000 Hertz, a high fidelity range.

The second-generation Dimensia audio components were also made for the Digital Command Component System.

=== Digital command component system ===
In 1985, RCA released a fully integrated audio system known as the "RCA Audio System" that used the MSR-140 stereo receiver as its center for control over all the components. This allowed all Dimensia audio components to be controlled and fully functional without the need of a Dimensia television set. The price of this system started at $1,500 and included the Digital Command Center remote control. It also used the Colortrak 2000 monitor.

The SPK400 and SPK500, released in 1987, were second generation three-way speaker systems. Also released in 1987 for the second generation Dimensia system and for the Digital Command Component System were the MPA-100 and MPA-120 amplifiers; released to replace the MSA-100 and MSA-200, respectively.

In 1987, RCA released the MSP400 for the second-generation Dimensia audio system, an early Dolby Pro Logic surround sound decoder.

== Gallery ==
Various images of a 1987 console model GPR2740T

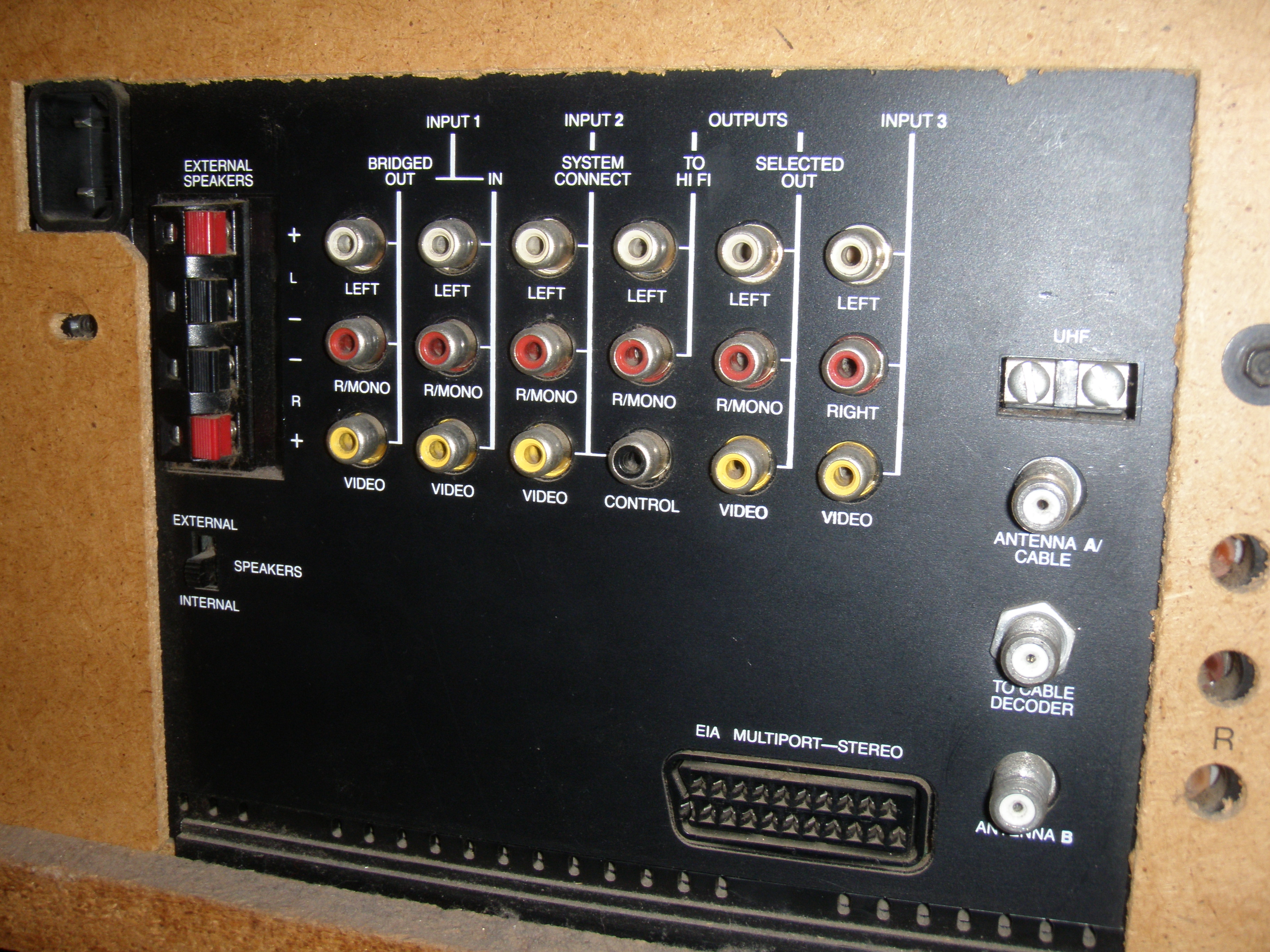
Console Dimensia input/output panel

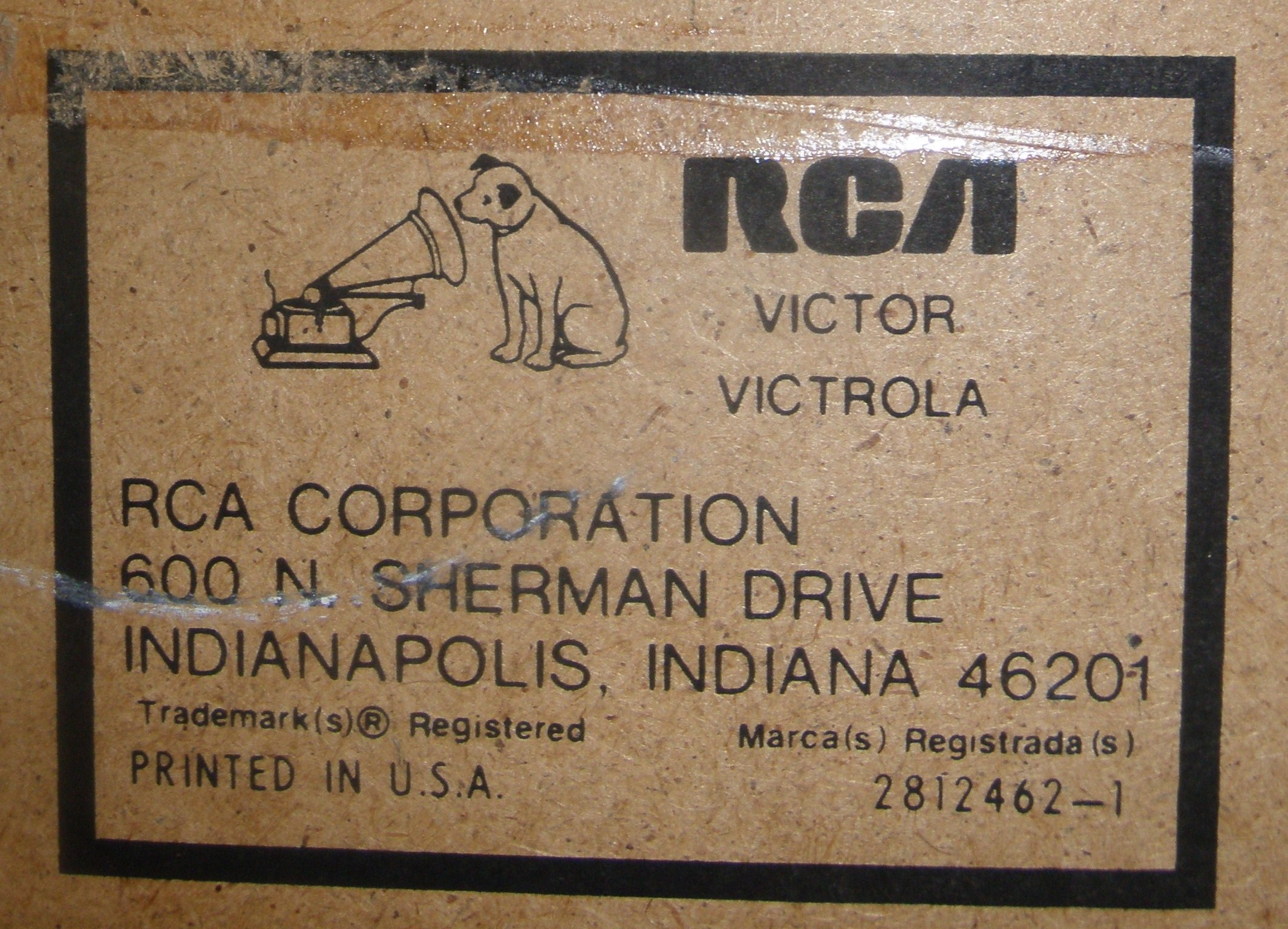
Dimensia console TV displaying RCA trademarks

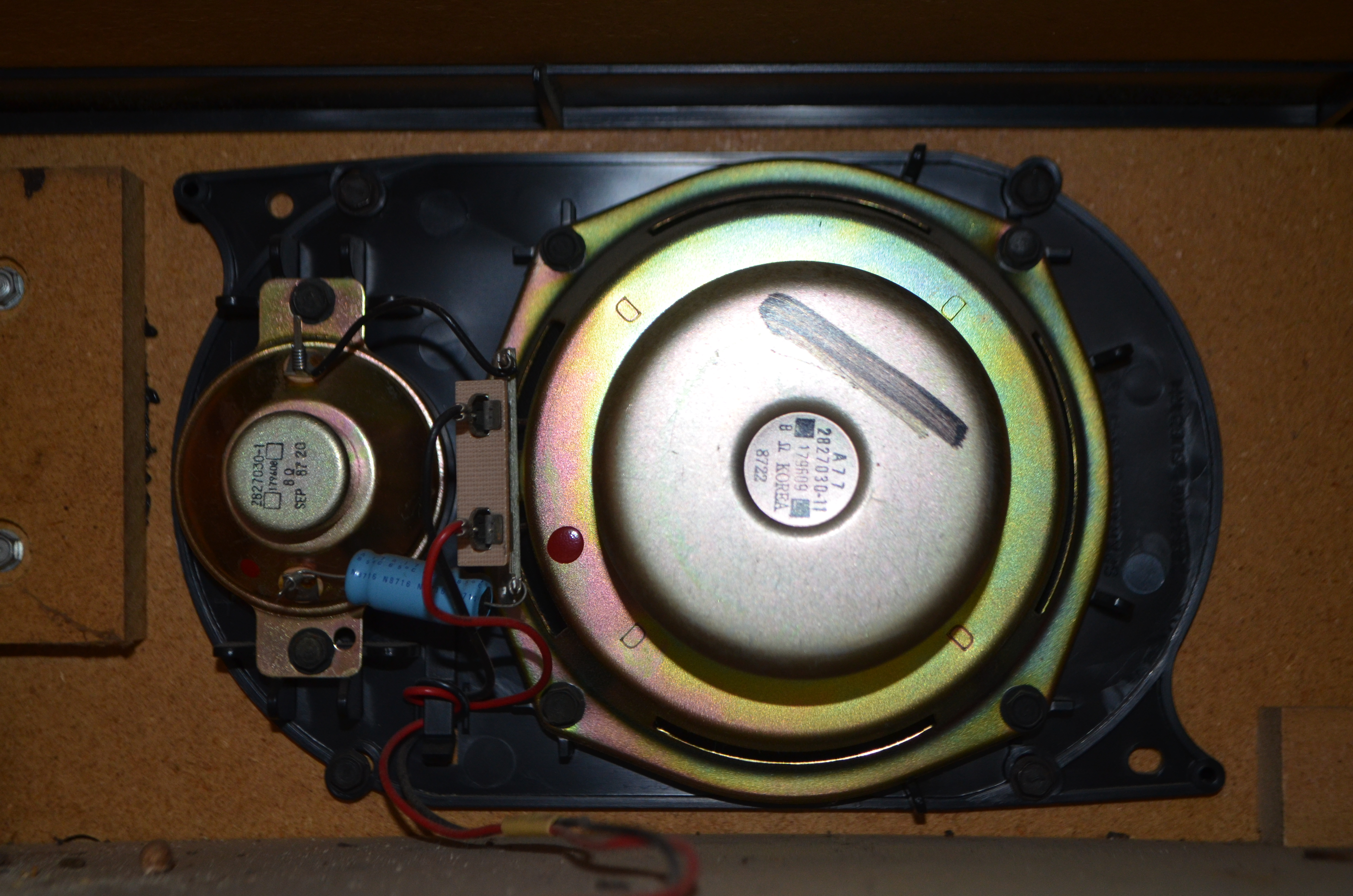
Two-way speaker system in console model

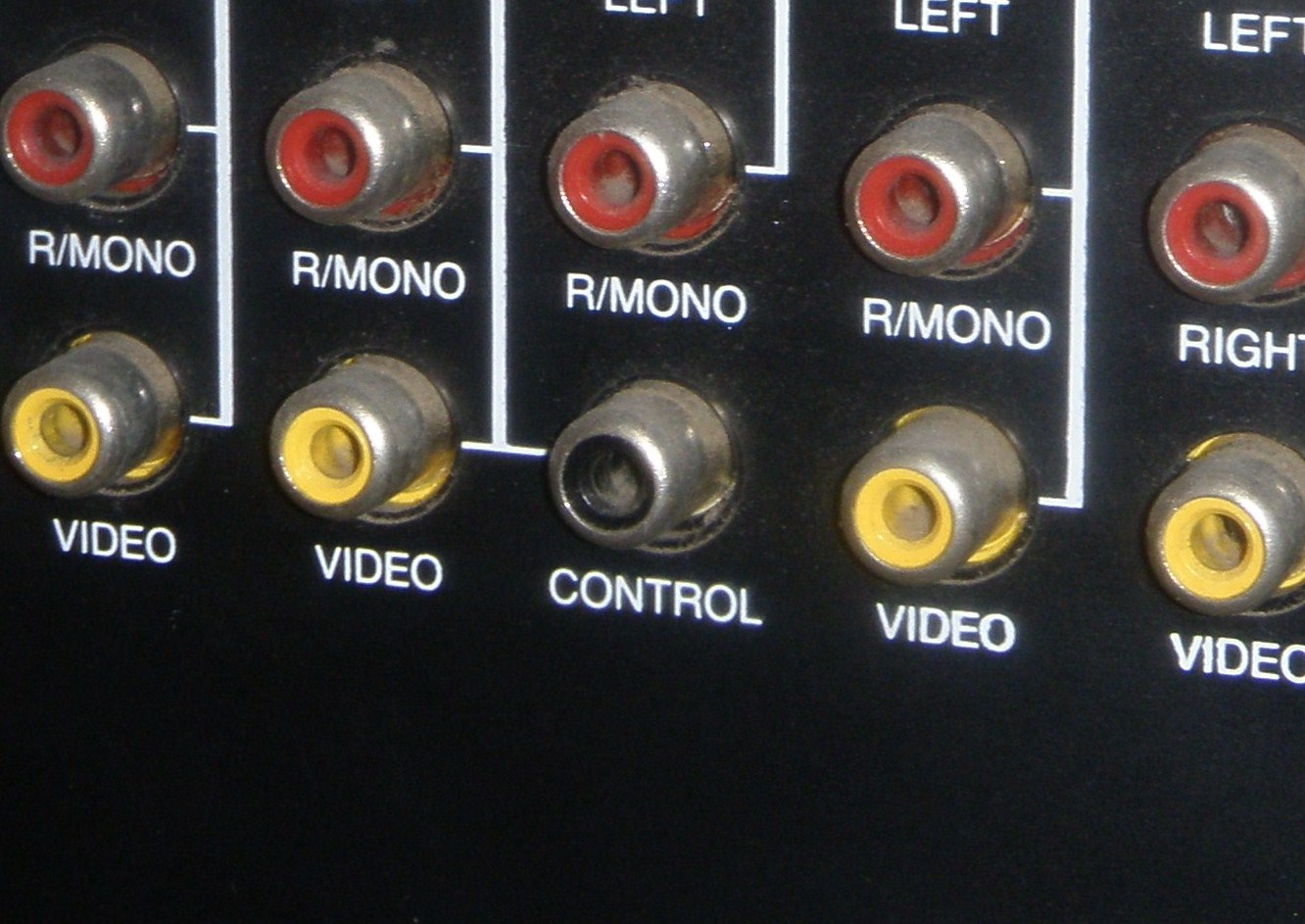
Dimensia SystemLink bus

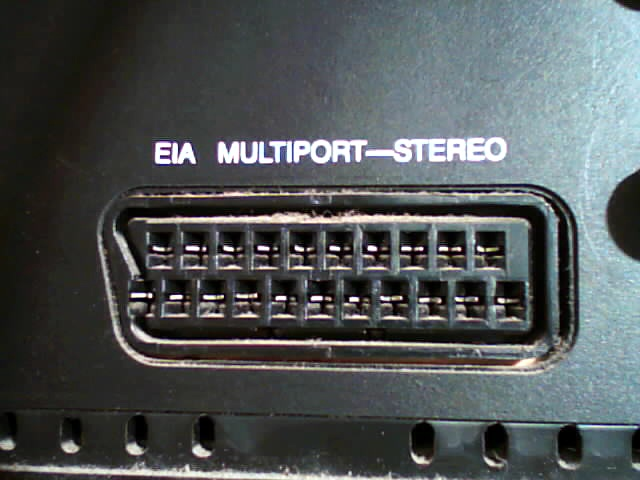
EIA interface SCART connector on a 1987 RCA Dimensia

== See also ==
- Capacitance Electronic Disc, another one of RCA's innovations
