= Television Electronic Disc =

Discontinued video recording format released in 1975

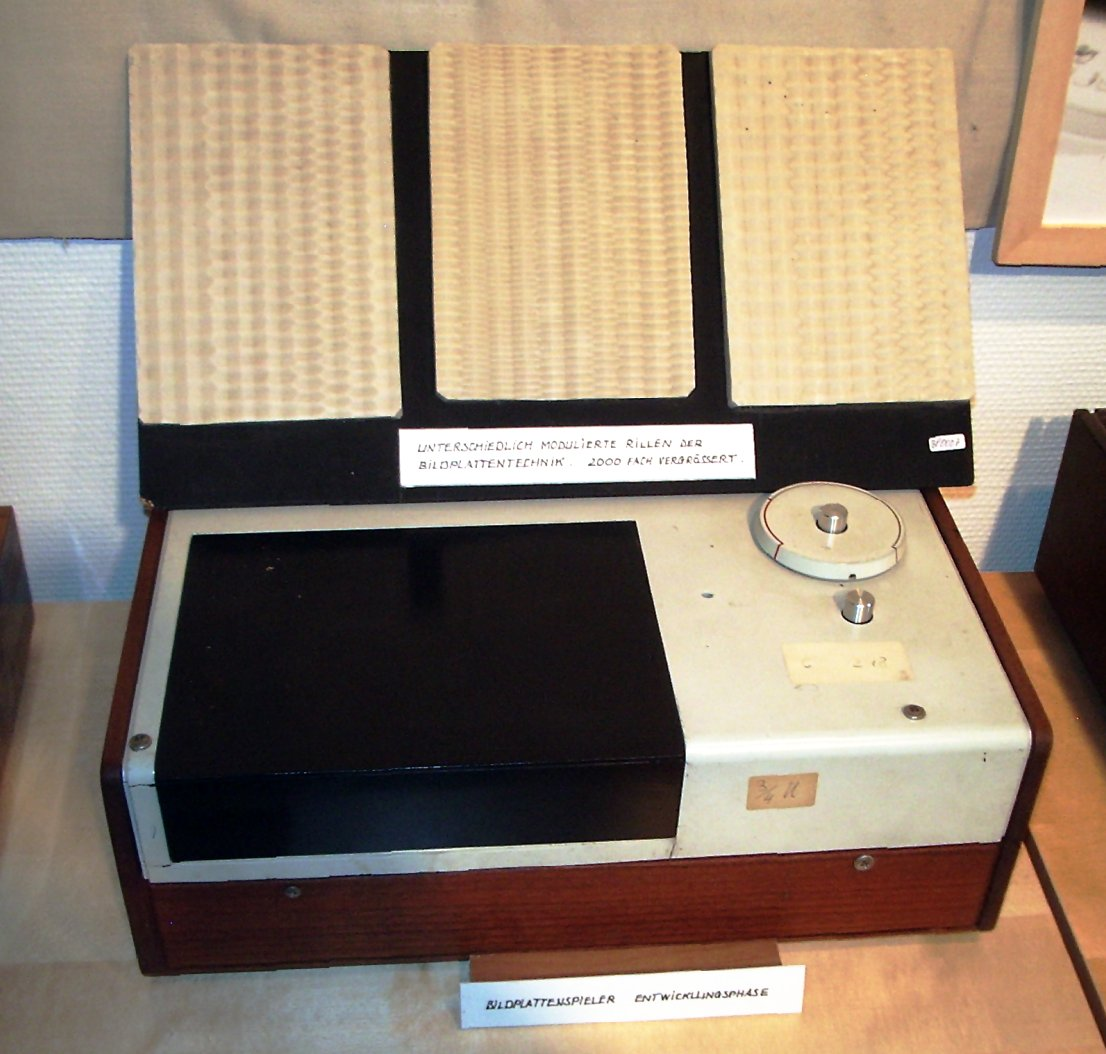
Design prototype of a player for the Telefunken TED video disc.

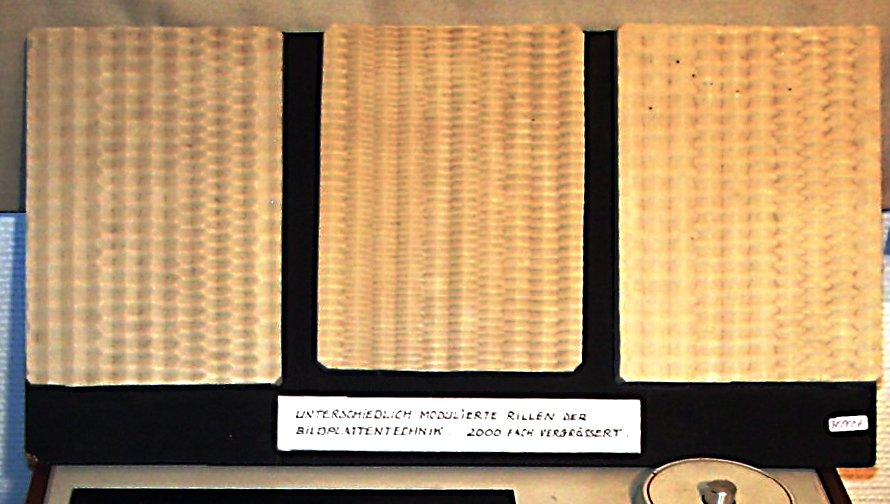
Samples of the video signal storage grooves on a TED video disc. Enlarged 2000 times for exhibitional purposes.

Television Electronic Disc (TeD) is a discontinued video recording format, released in 1975 by Telefunken and Teldec. The format used 8-inch-diameter (200 mm) flexible foil discs, which spun at 1,500 rpm on a cushion of air. TeD never gained wide acceptance, and could not compete against the emerging videocassette systems of the time.

== History ==
Initially known as "The Video Disc" or the Teldec Television Disc, TeD (Television Electronic Disc) was first announced at a press conference in Berlin on June 24, 1970. It was developed by a team from two German companies: AEG-Telefunken and Teldec. Program information was stored in the form of ridges in the surface of a thin, flexible foil disc, which was claimed to be sufficiently robust to withstand being played 1,000 times. The main technological breakthrough was the vertical recording method that reduced the track pitch to 0.007 mm, and increased the rotation speed to 1,500 rpm, making it possible to record 130–150 grooves per millimeter, compared with the typical 10–13 grooves on an audio disc. This increased the available bandwidth from around 15 kHz to 3 MHz. The tracks were read by a pressure pick-up, which translated the surface of the ridges, via a piezo-electric crystal, into an electrical signal. Tracking was controlled not by the pick-up resting within the walls of a groove, but by a mechanical coupling on which the pick-up mounting is supported. There was no turntable. The rotation of the disc at 1,500 rpm created a thin cushion of air between the disc and a fixed plate. Vertical movement of the disc was kept to within 0.05mm. Eight-inch discs could store five minutes of programming, twelve-inch discs about 7½ minutes.

== Marketing ==
By autumn 1972, the name of the system had just been changed to TeD (for Television Disc) and the playing time of the eight-inch disc had been doubled to 10 minutes. TeD players were finally introduced on the West German market on 17 March 1975. Six labels offered programs: Decca, Teldec Intertel, Telefunken, Ufa/ATB, Ullstein AV and Videophon. Within the first three months 6,000 players had been shipped to 2,500 dealers, and 50,000 discs were in the shops. Sanyo Electric Co., Ltd. of Japan, which had been conducting similar research itself (but was by now also developing the V-Cord videocassette recorder), was granted a licence to produce a version that would play out in the NTSC television format and by the end of 1976 had devised a long-awaited auto-changer that took 12 10-minute discs. Also in Japan, General Corporation took a manufacturing licence in July 1976 with an expectation of coming to market in April 1977. A software consortium, Nippon Video Systems, was formed around the same time. By the end of 1978 Telefunken itself had adopted VHS.
