= SelectaVision =

Former RCA video brand

- Product type: Home video player
- Current owner: RCA
- Introduced: 1981
- Discontinued: 1986

SelectaVision was a trademark name used on four classes of device by the Radio Corporation of America:

- The Holotape, a prototype video medium
- Magnetic tape
- VHS videocassette recorders, and
- Capacitance Electronic Disc videodisc players and the discs themselves, introduced in 1981.

Capacitance Electronic Disc's competitors, Philips/Magnavox and Pioneer, instead manufactured optical discs, read with lasers.On April 4, 1984, RCA, having sold only 550,000 players, ended sales, losing $580 million. The losses resulted in General Electric's acquisition of RCA in 1986, and the "SelectaVision" brand was abandoned.

== See also ==
- Video High Density (JVC, 1970)
- Electronic Video Recording (CBS, 1967)
- Phonovision (Baird, 1928)
- Vitascan (DuMont, 1949)
