= Capacitance Electronic Disc =

Analog video disc playback system

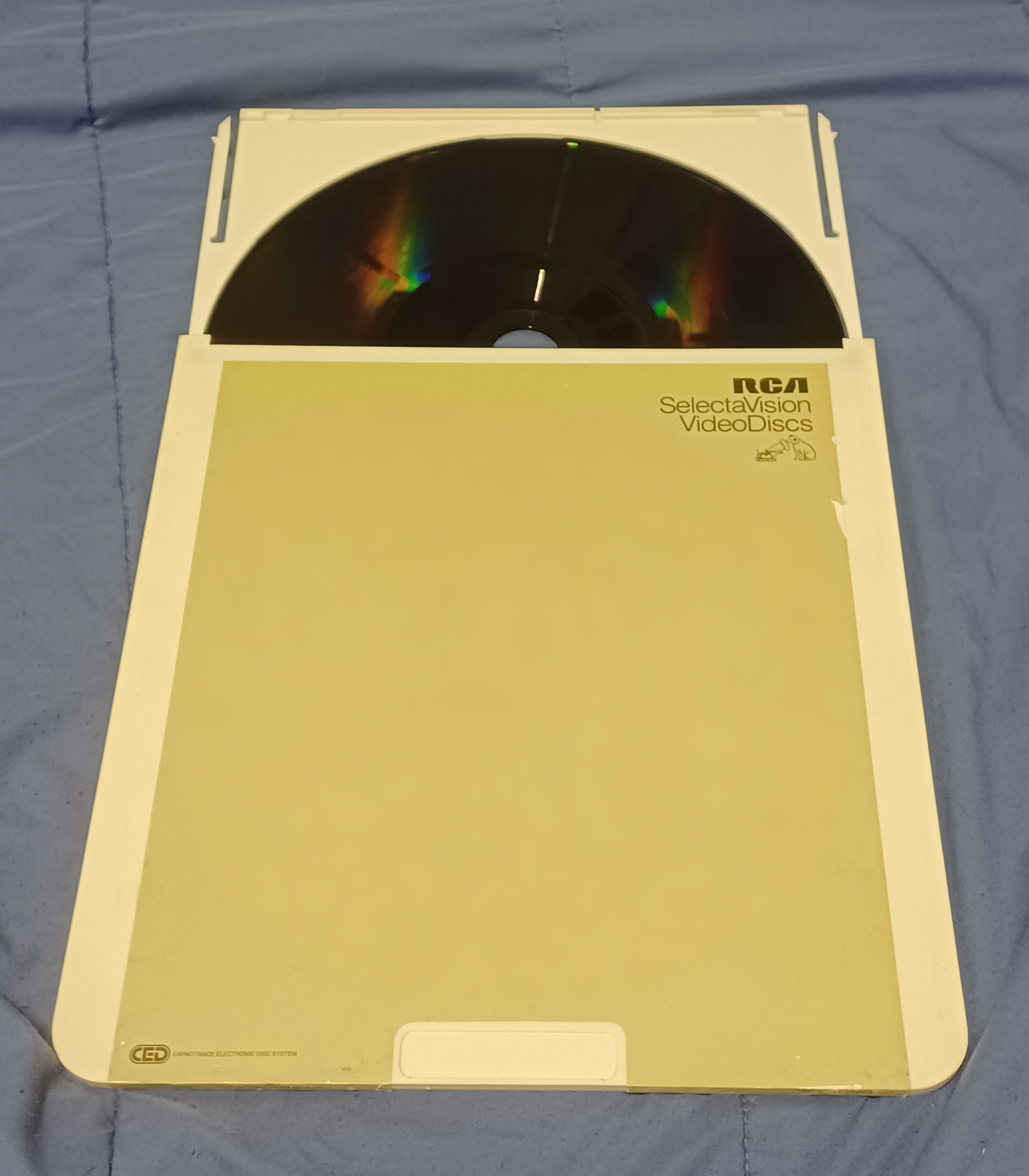
- A CED of The Boys from Brazil (1978), exposed from its protective caddy. The cover art in this image has been edited to remove copyrighted material.
- Media type: video Playback media
- Capacity: 60 minutes NTSC video per side, 27,000 still frames per side
- Read mechanism: Stylus
- Usage: Home video
- Released: March 22, 1981
- Discontinued: 1986 (RCA)

The Capacitance Electronic Disc (CED) is an analog video disc playback system developed by Radio Corporation of America (RCA), in which video and audio could be played back on a TV set using a special stylus and high-density groove system similar to phonograph records.

First conceived in 1964, the CED system was widely seen as a technological success which was able to increase the density of a long-playing record by two orders of magnitude. Despite that achievement, the CED system fell victim to poor planning, various conflicts with RCA management, and several technical difficulties. That slowed development and stalled production of the system for 17 years, until 1981, by which time it had been made obsolete by laser videodisc (DiscoVision, later called LaserVision and LaserDisc) as well as Betamax and VHS video cassette formats. Sales for the system were nowhere near projected estimates. In the spring of 1984, RCA announced it was discontinuing player production, but continued the production of videodiscs until 1986, losing an estimated $650 million in the process. RCA had initially intended to release the SKT425 CED player with its high-end Dimensia system in late 1984, but cancelled CED player production prior to the system's release.

The format was commonly known as "videodisc", leading to confusion with the contemporaneous LaserDisc format. LaserDiscs are read optically with a laser beam, whereas CED discs were read physically with a stylus, similar to a conventional phonograph record. The two systems were incompatible.

RCA used the brand name "SelectaVision" for the CED system, a name also used for some early RCA brand VCRs, and other experimental projects at RCA. The Video High Density system is similar to that of CED.

== History ==
=== Beginnings and release ===
RCA began developing the videodisc system in 1964, in an attempt to produce a phonograph-like method of reproducing video under the name 'Discpix'. Research and development was slow in the early years, as the RCA CED team originally consisted of only four men, but by 1972, the CED team had produced a disc capable of holding ten minutes of color video (a portion of the Get Smart episode "A Tale of Two Tails", re-titled "Lum Fong").

The first CED prototype discs were multi-layered, consisting of a vinyl substrate, nickel conductive layer, glow-discharge insulating layer and silicone lubricant top layer. Failure to fully solve the stylus/disc wear and manufacturing complexity forced RCA to seek simpler construction of the disc. The final disc was crafted using PVC blended with carbon to make the disc conductive. To preserve stylus and groove life, a thin layer (up to 50 nm thick) of silicone (polysiloxane) or methyl alkyl siloxane was applied to the disc as a lubricant.

CED videodiscs were originally conceived as being housed in jackets and handled by hand similar to LP records, but during testing it was shown that exposure to dust caused skipped grooves. If dust was allowed to settle on the discs, the dust would absorb moisture from the air and cement the dust particle to the disc surface, causing the stylus to jump back in a locked groove situation. Thus, an idea was developed in which the disc would be stored and handled in a plastic caddy from which the CED would be extracted by the player so that exposure to dust would be minimized.

After 17 years of research and development, the first CED player (model SFT100W) went on sale on March 22, 1981. A catalog of approximately 50 videodisc titles was released at the same time. The first title to be manufactured was Race for Your Life, Charlie Brown. Fifteen months later, RCA released the SGT200 and SGT250 players, both with stereo sound while the SGT-250 was also the first CED player model to include a wireless remote control. Models with random access were introduced in 1983.

=== Demise ===
Several problems doomed the RCA CED videodisc system long before it was even announced. The introduction of VCRs and home videotape in the mid 1970s—with their longer storage capacity and recording capabilities—posed a major threat to the system. However, development of CED continued. When the forthcoming system was formally announced in late 1979, RCA had projected annual sales of between five and six million players and 200 to 500 million videodiscs. The company had expected to sell 200,000 players by the end of 1981, but only about half that number had been sold, and there was little improvement in sales throughout 1982 and 1983.

"...Machiavelli noted that '..there is nothing more difficult to take in hand, more perilous to conduct, or more uncertain in its success, than to take the lead in the introduction of a new order of things...' At videodisc, I believe these words had special significance..."
Dr. Jay J. Brandinger, Vice President, RCA SelectaVision Videodisc Operations, June 27, 1986.

The extremely long period of development—caused in part by political turmoil and a great deal of turnover in the high management of RCA—also contributed to the demise of the CED system. RCA had originally slated 1977 as the release date for the videodisc system; at that point, discs were not able to hold more than 30 minutes of video per side and the nickel-like compound used for manufacturing the discs was not sturdy enough. Signal degradation was also a problem, as handling the discs was causing them to deteriorate more rapidly than expected, baffling engineers.

60 minutes per side rendered it impossible for most movies over 120 minutes to be released on one CED disc. Many popular films such as some of the James Bond series, Mary Poppins, Star Trek: The Motion Picture and Return of the Jedi had to be released on two CED discs. All three of these examples were typically available on one VHS/Betamax cassette.

RCA had projected that by 1985, CED players would be in nearly 50% of American homes, but the sales of players continued to drop. RCA cut the prices of CED players and offered incentives to consumers such as rebates and free discs, but sales only slightly improved. RCA management realized that the system would never be profitable and on April 4, 1984, announced the discontinuation of production of CED players. Remaining stocks of players were sold by dealers and liquidation retailers for as little as $20 each. Unexpectedly, demand for the videodiscs themselves suddenly became high immediately after the announcement; RCA alerted dealers and customers that videodiscs would continue to be manufactured and new titles released for at least another three years after the discontinuation of players. Less than a year after this announcement, the sale of discs began to decline, prompting RCA to abandon videodisc production in 1986, after only two years. The last titles released were The Jewel of the Nile by CBS/Fox Video, and Memories of VideoDisc, a commemorative CED given to many RCA employees involved with the CED project, both in 1986.

== Technology ==
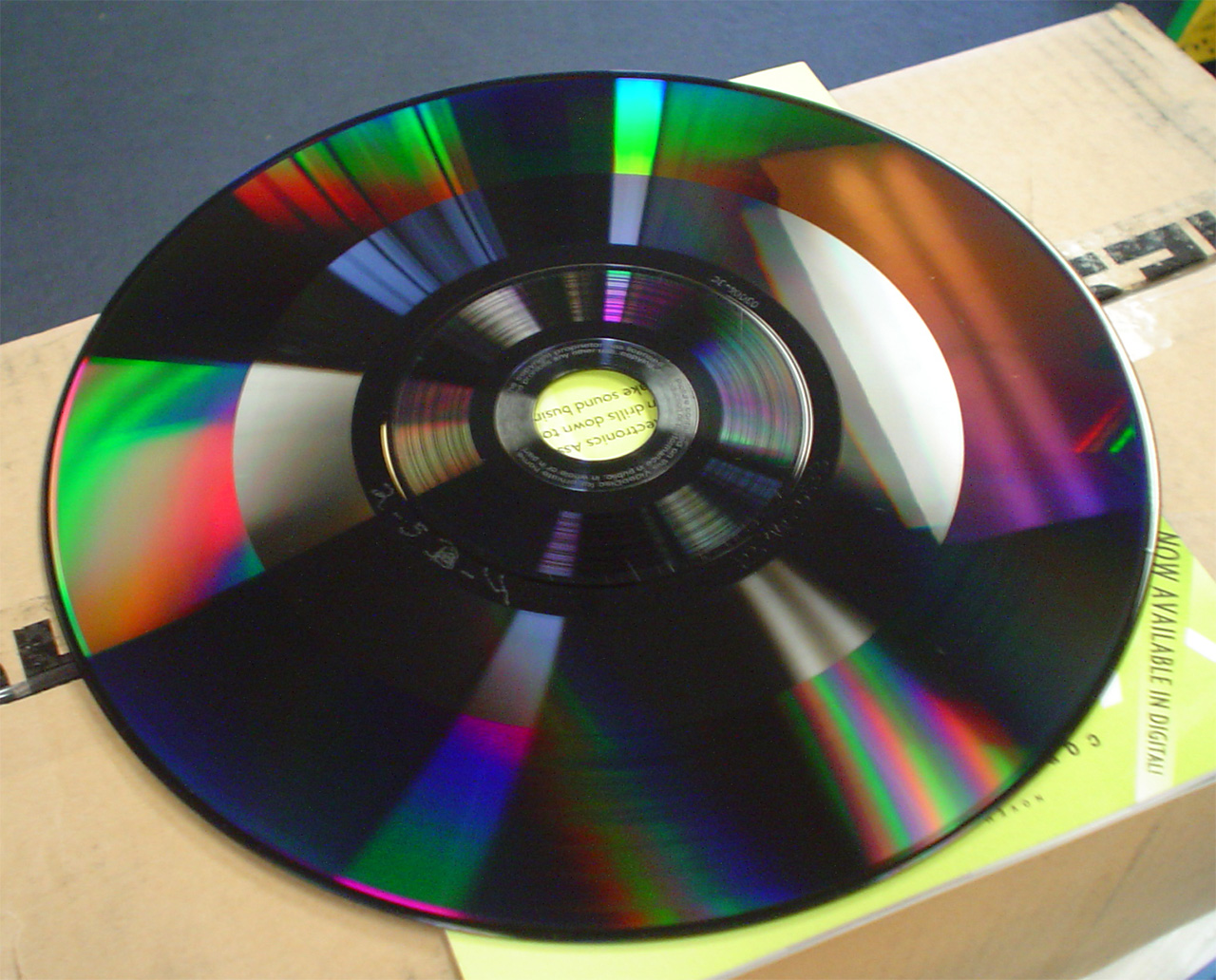
Exposed CED disc

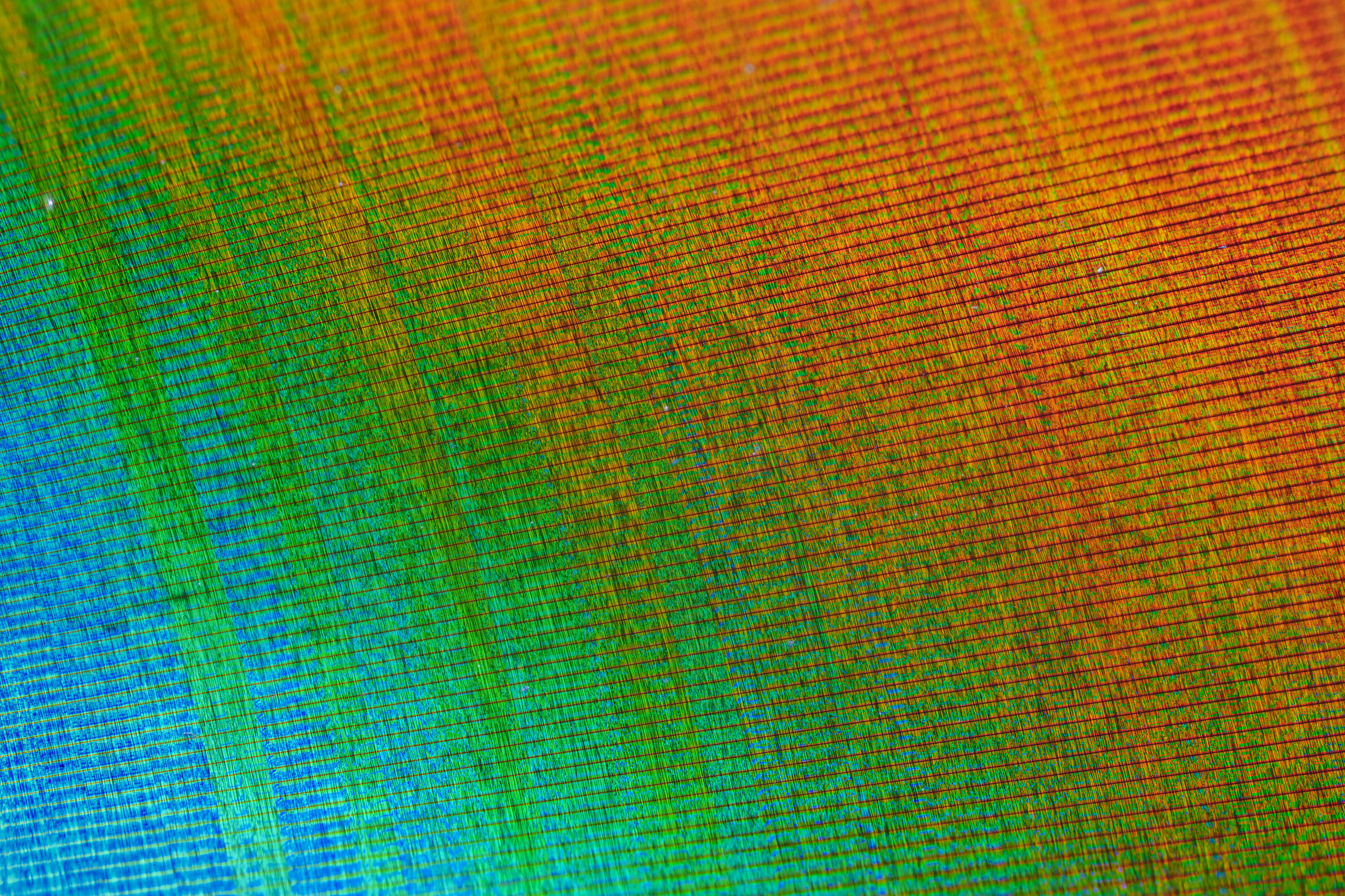
Macro photograph of a CED disc, showing the microgrooves of the NTSC signal interacting with light

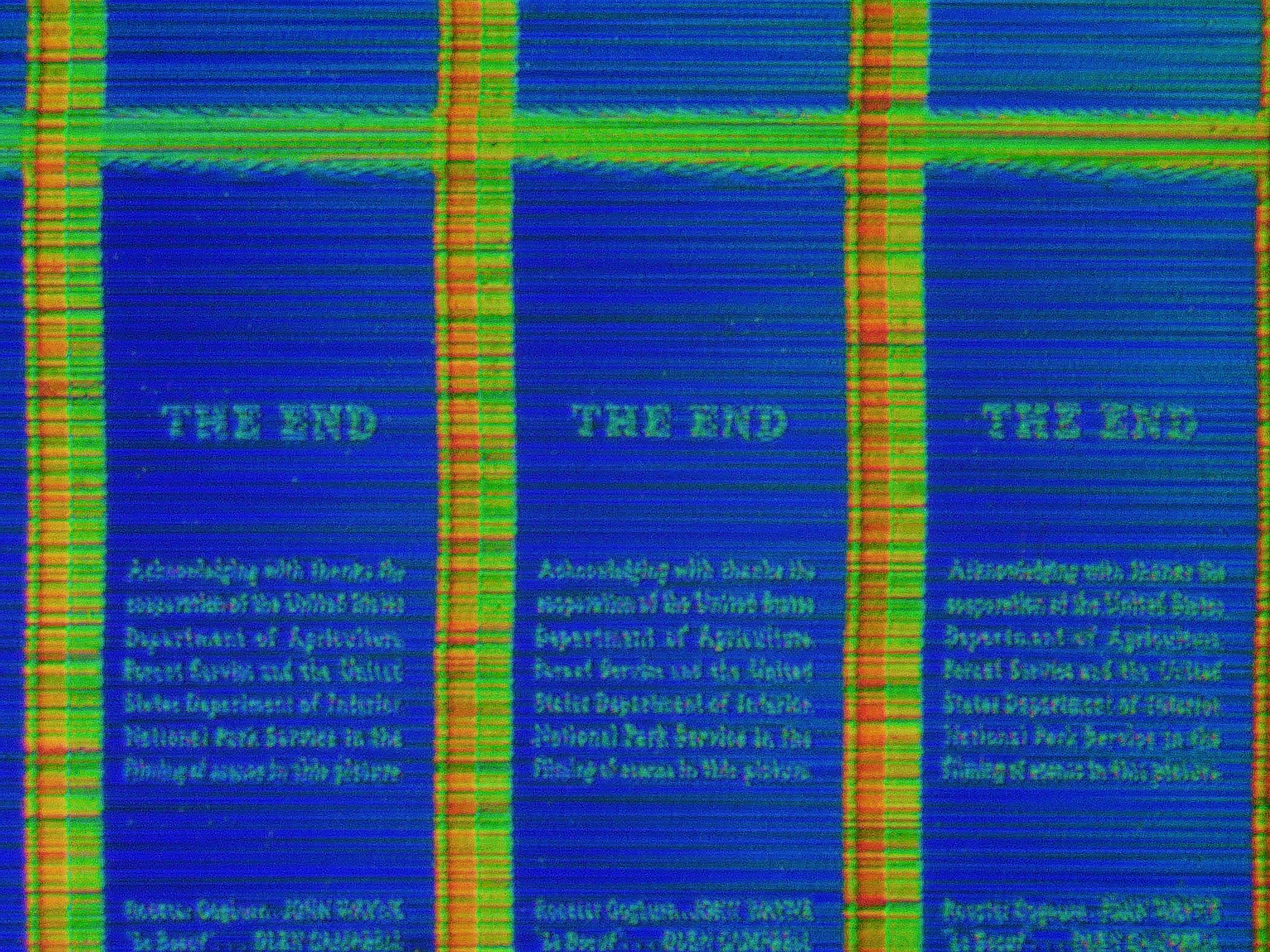
200× light micrograph of a CED copy of True Grit (1969), showing that in this special case the closing credits of the film are directly visible on the disc itself. Because adjacent tracks on a CED encode the same line in the video signal across different frames, and because the closing credits scroll vertically at a constant rate, the signal produces a coherent image on the disc medium.

CEDs are conductive vinyl platters that are 30.0 cm (11.8 in) in diameter. To avoid metric names they are usually called "12 inch discs". A CED has a spiral groove on both sides. The groove is 657 nm wide and has a length of up to 19 km (12 mi). The discs rotate at a constant angular speed during playback (450 rpm for NTSC, 375 rpm for PAL) and each rotation contains eight interlaced fields, or four full frames of video. These appear as spokes on the disc surface, with the gap between each field clearly visible under certain light. This meant that freeze frame was impossible on players without an expensive electronic frame store facility.

A keel-shaped diamond stylus with a titanium electrode layer applied by physical vapor deposition, rides in the groove with extremely light tracking force (65 mg) and an electronic circuit is formed through the disc and stylus. Like an audio turntable, the stylus reads the disc, starting at the outer edge and going towards the center. The video and audio signals are stored on the Videodiscs in a composite analog signal which is encoded into vertical undulations in the bottom of the groove, somewhat like pits. These undulations have a shorter wavelength than the length of the stylus tip in the groove, and the stylus rides over them; the varying distance between the stylus tip and the conductive surface due to the depth of the undulations in the groove under the stylus directly controls the capacitance between the stylus and the conductive carbon-loaded PVC disc. This varying capacitance in turn alters the frequency of a resonant circuit, producing an FM electrical signal, which is then decoded into video and audio signals by the player's electronics.

The capacitive stylus pickup system which gives the CED its name can be contrasted with the technology of the conventional phonograph. Whereas the phonograph stylus physically vibrates with the variations in the record groove, and those vibrations are converted by a mechanical transducer (the phono pickup) to an electrical signal, the CED stylus normally does not vibrate and moves only to track the CED groove (and the disc surface—out-of-plane), while the signal from the stylus is natively obtained as an electrical signal. This more sophisticated system, combined with a high revolution rate, is necessary to enable the encoding of video signals with bandwidth of a few megahertz, compared to a maximum of 20 kilohertz for an audio-only signal—a difference of two orders of magnitude. Also, while the undulations in the bottom of the groove may be likened to pits, the spacing of vertical wave crests and troughs in a CED groove is continuously variable, as the CED is an analog medium. Usually, the term "pits", when used in the context of information media, refers to features with sharply defined edges and discrete lengths and depths, such as the pits on digital optical media such as CDs and DVDs.

In order to maintain an extremely light tracking force, the stylus arm is surrounded by coils, which sense deflection, and a circuit in the player responds to the signals from these coils by moving the stylus head carriage in steps as the groove pulls the stylus across the disc. Other coils are used to deflect the stylus, to finely adjust tracking. This system is very similar to—yet predates—the one used in Compact Disc players to follow the spiral optical track, where typically a servo motor moves the optical pickup in steps for coarse tracking and a set of coils shifts the laser lens for fine tracking, both guided by an optical sensing device, which is the analogue of CED stylus-deflection sensing coils. For the CED player, this tracking arrangement has the additional benefit that the stylus drag angle remains uniformly tangent to the groove, unlike the case for a phonograph tonearm, in which the stylus drag angle and consequently the stylus side force varies with the tonearm angle, which in turn depends on the radial position on the record of the stylus. For phonographs with pinpoint tip styli, linear tracking is merely ideal to reduce wear of records and styli and to maximize tracking stability; for a CED player linear tracking is a necessity for the keel-shaped stylus, which must always stay tangent to the groove. Furthermore, the achievement of an extremely light tracking force on the CED stylus enables the use of a fine groove pitch (i.e. fine spacing of adjacent revolutions of the spiral), necessary to provide a long playing time at the required high rotational speed, while also limiting the rate of disc and stylus wear.

The disc is stored inside a caddy, from which the player extracts it when it is loaded. The disc itself is surrounded by a "spine", a plastic ring (actually square on the outside edge) with a thick, straight rim-like edge, which extends outside of, and latches into, the caddy. When a person inserts a caddy containing a disc into the player, the player captures the spine, and both the disc and the spine are left in the player as the person pulls the caddy out. The inner edges of the opening of the caddy have felt strips designed to catch any dust or other debris that could be on the disc as it is extracted. Once the caddy has been withdrawn by the person, the player loads the disc onto the turntable, either manually with all SFT and most SGT prefix RCA players or automatically with the RCA SGT-250 and all other models and brands of players. When playback has been started, the player spins the disc up to speed while moving the pickup arm over the disc surface and lowering the stylus onto the beginning of the disc.

When Stop is pressed, the stylus is lifted from the disc and returned to its parking location, and the disc and spine are lifted up again to align with the caddy slot. When ready, the slot is unlocked, and the caddy can be inserted and withdrawn by a person, now with the disc back inside.

== Advantages ==
CED players, from an early point in their life, appealed to a lower-income market more than VHS, Betamax, and LaserDisc. The video quality (approximately 3 MHz of luma bandwidth for CED) was comparable to or better than a VHS-SP or Betamax-II video, but sub-par compared to LaserDisc (about 5 MHz of luma bandwidth).

CED players were intended to be "low-cost" because they cost around half as much to manufacture as a VCR and had fewer precision parts. The discs themselves could be inexpensively duplicated, stamped out on slightly-modified audio LP record presses.

Like VCRs, CED videodisc players had features like rapid forward/reverse and visual search forward/reverse. They also had a pause feature, though it blanked the screen rather than displaying a still image; many players featured a "page mode", during which the current block of four successive frames would be repeatedly displayed.

Since CEDs were a disc-based system, they did not require rewinding. Early discs were available only in monophonic sound, but many later discs were issued in stereo sound. (Mono CED discs were packaged in white protective caddies, while the caddies for stereo discs were blue.) Other discs could be switched between two separate mono audio tracks, providing features such as bilingual audio capability.

Like the LaserDisc and DVD, some CEDs feature random access, allowing users to quickly move to certain parts of the movie. Each side of a CED disc could be split into up to 63 "chapters", or bands. Two late RCA players (the SJT400 and SKT400) could access these bands in any given order. Unlike its laser-based counterparts, the chapters in a CED are based on minutes of the film, not scenes.

Novelty discs and CED-based games were produced whereby accessing the chapters in a specified order would string together a different story each time. However, only a few were produced before the halt of CED player manufacturing, and CEDs are much more prone to wear and tear compared to LaserDisc.

== Disadvantages ==
In comparison with LaserDisc technology, CEDs suffered from the fact that they were a phonograph-style contact medium: RCA estimated that the number of times a CED videodisc could be played back, under ideal conditions, was 500. By comparison, a clean, laser rot-free LaserDisc could, in theory, be played an unlimited number of times (although repeated or careless handling could still result in damage).

Since the CED system used a stylus to read the discs, it was necessary to regularly change the stylus in the player to avoid damage to the videodiscs, while worn and damaged discs also caused problems for consumers. When a disc began to wear, video and audio quality would severely decline, and the disc would begin to skip. Several discs suffered from a condition called "video virus", where a CED would skip a great deal due to dust particles stuck in the grooves of the disc. However, playing the disc several times would generally solve this problem.

Unlike VHS tapes, CEDs (along with LaserDisc) required a disc flip (however, some LaserDisc players were able to read both sides of the disc without physically flipping the disc, achieved by moving the laser from one side of the disc to the other, but this still resulted in a pause of playback during the change) at some point during the course of almost all films as only sixty minutes of video could be stored per side (75 mins on UK PAL discs due to the slower rotation speed); if a feature ran over two hours, it would be necessary to spread the feature over two discs.

In some cases, if a movie's theatrical running time was only slightly longer than two hours, studios would often trim short scenes throughout the movie and/or employ time compression (speeding the extra run time out of the film) in order to avoid the expense of issuing two discs.

This problem was not unique to CEDs: LaserDiscs presented the same difficulty, and some longer features, such as The Ten Commandments (1956), still required more than one tape or disc in the VHS, Beta, and LaserDisc formats. There were no two-disc UK PAL releases.

Less significant disadvantages include lack of support for freeze-frame during pause, since CEDs scanned four frames in one rotation versus one frame per rotation on CAV LaserDisc, while computer technology was not advanced enough at the time to outfit the player with a framebuffer affordably. However, a "page mode" was available on many players that would allow those four frames to be repeated in an endless loop.

CEDs were also larger than VHS tapes, thicker than LaserDiscs, and considerably heavier due to the plastic caddies.

== Manufacture ==
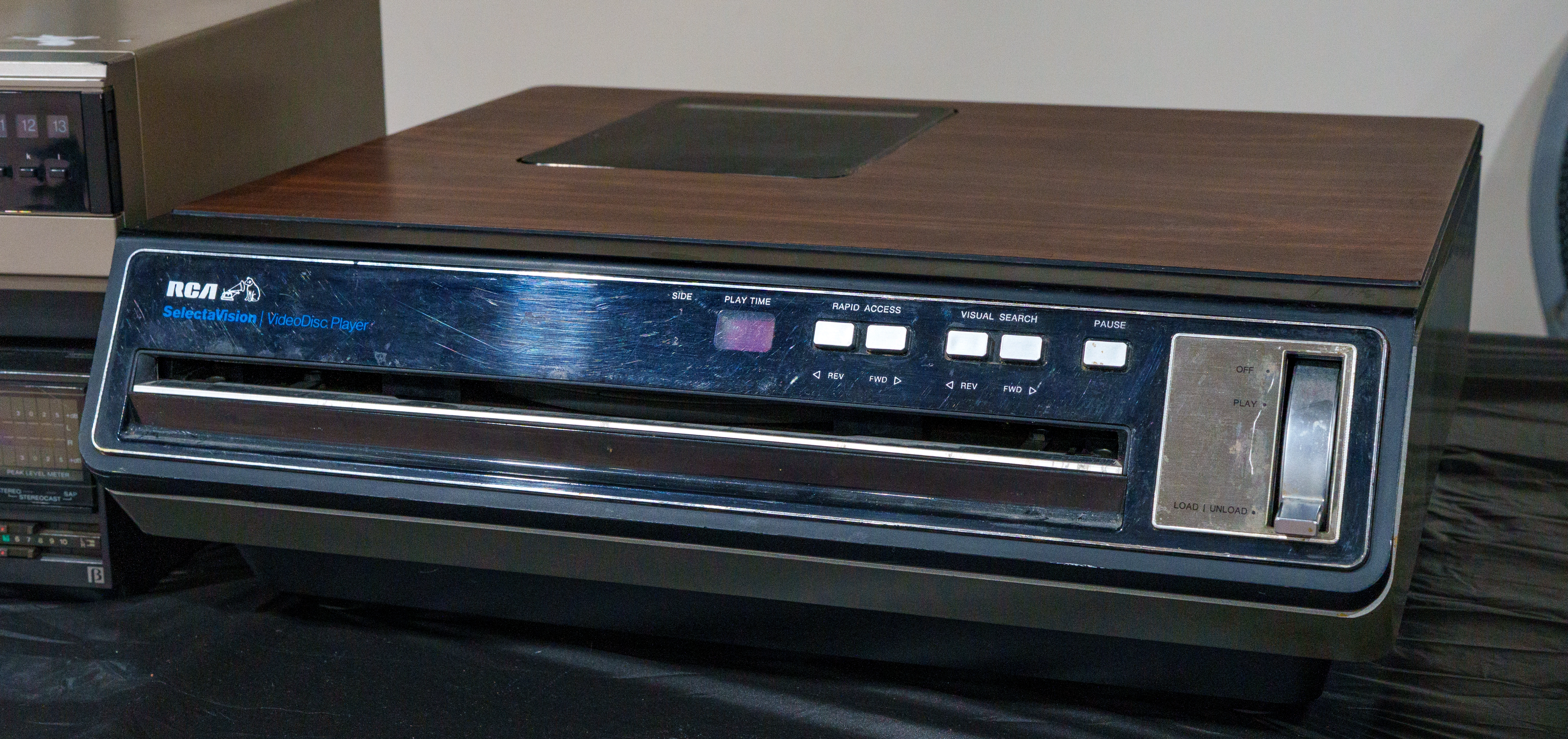
RCA's 1981 SelectaVision VideoDisc Player, the SGT-100

=== Players ===
CED players were manufactured by four companies—RCA, Hitachi, Sanyo, and Toshiba—but seven other companies marketed players manufactured by these companies.

=== Media ===
Upon release of the CED system in March 1981, 50 titles were initially available; along with RCA (which included the company's partnership with Columbia Pictures plus Paramount and Disney releases), CBS Video Enterprises (later CBS/FOX Video) produced the first 50 titles. Eventually, Disney, Metro-Goldwyn-Mayer, Paramount Pictures, MCA, Vestron Video, and other labels began to produce CED discs under their own home video labels, and did so until the end of disc manufacturing in 1986.

== Market reception ==
Capacitance Electronic Disc's competitors, Philips/Magnavox and Pioneer, instead manufactured optical discs, read with lasers. On April 4, 1984, after sales of only 550,000 players, RCA announced the discontinuation of CED videodisc players. RCA's losses since the product's introduction were eventually estimated at $650 million. The huge financial losses partially resulted in General Electric's acquisition of RCA in 1986, and the abandonment of the "SelectaVision" brand on all RCA video products.

== See also ==
- Direct metal mastering
- Videotape format war
- Video High Density
