= Women's Radio Corps =

Branch of the US Army Signal Corps during the First World War

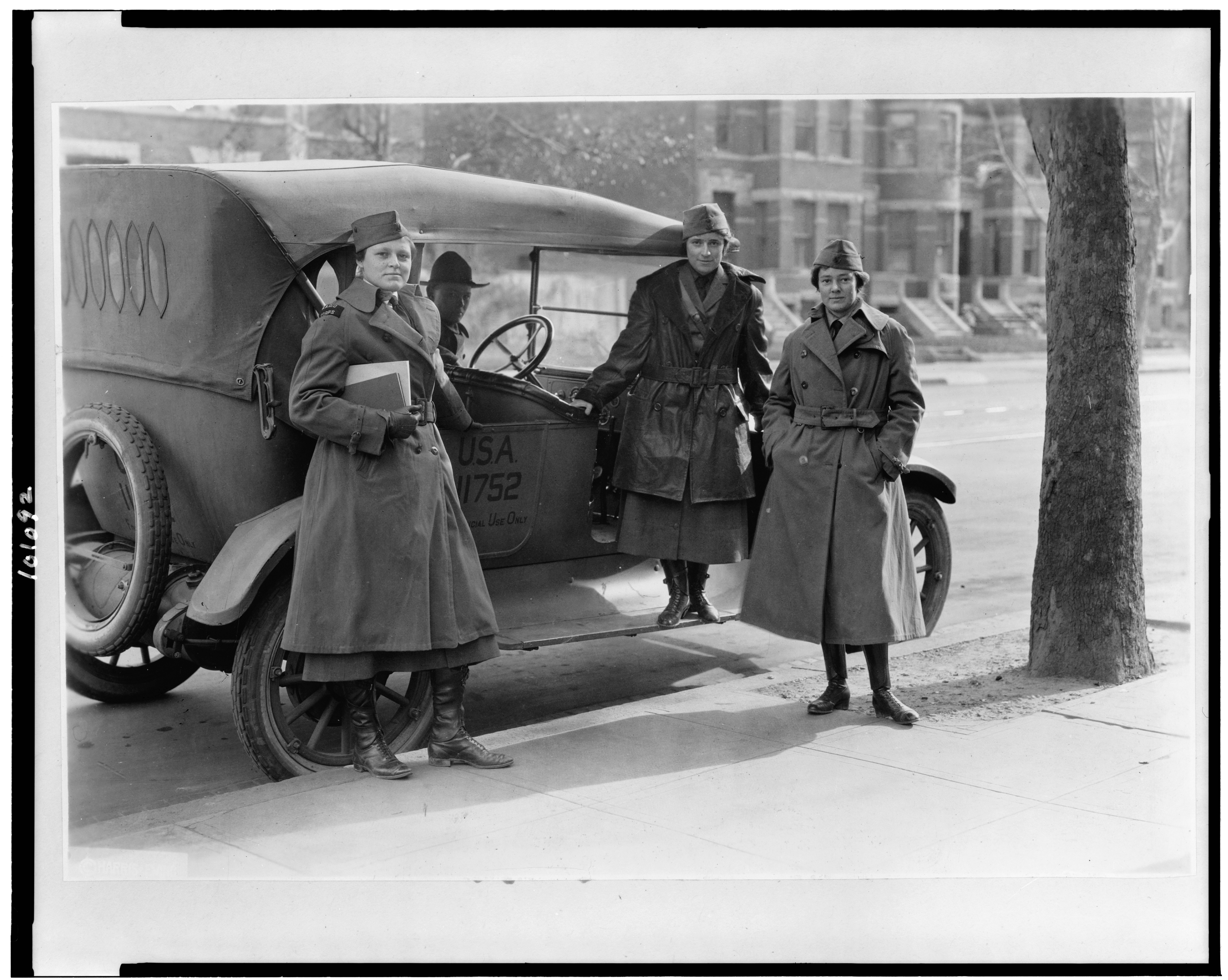
Left to right: Elizabeth Baker, Lorena Reed, and Elise Owen.

The Women's Radio Corps (WRC) was established by Edna Owen (generally credited under her husband's name, Mrs Herbert Sumner Owen) and an advisory council during World War I. The aim of this branch of the US Army Signal Corps was to recruit women to train as wireless operators, in order to replace male wireless operators who had gone to war. The activities of the Corps converged with the wartime wireless activities and training of the National League for Women's Service whose training classes were directed by Owen.

== Foundation ==
The Women's Radio Corps was established during World War I by Edna Owen and an advisory council consisting of many influential figures in the field of wireless communications: Gano Dunn, past president of the American Institute of Electrical Engineers; Alfred Goldsmith, co-founder of the Institute of Radio Engineers; Edward J. Nally, vice president and general manager of the Marconi Wireless Telegraph Company of America; and Columbia University professor Michael Pupin, then president of the Institute of Radio Engineers. The council was chaired by Owen herself and responsibility for the supply of wireless training apparatus for the WRC fell to Nally's commercial manager, David Sarnoff.

Six days after the US entered the war in April 1917, Owen offered to provide 500 licensed female wireless operators in six months. Owen campaigned tirelessly to add recruits, lecturing up to 200 young women at once in lectures in New York and Washington, D.C., on the "many wonderful opportunities" brought by the occasion of the "great world war. . . . [I]t is your duty to prepare yourselves in order that you may set men free, that they may go to the front and fight for you and yours."

Members of the Women's Radio Corps took the same courses and received the same wireless licenses from the US Bureau of Navigation as male wireless operators. The first activity of the WRC was to teach wireless classes for drafted men on Long Island. Members of the WRC also served as inspectors of wireless apparatus and worked in the Radio Research and Development section of the US Army Signal Corps.

== After the war ==
With the Armistice declared in November 1918, the WRC was not demobilised but rather changed tack and began training women to work as commercial wireless operators - they believed wireless telegraphy was "one of the most important of the many new careers open to women" - as the US wireless stations nationalised during the war returned to private ownership.

By late 1918, some of the members of the WRC had moved to Washington, D.C., where they joined many other single women in filling in for male workers in government bureaucracies, setting up a boarding house and establishing their headquarters at 2834 14th Street in the Columbia Heights neighbourhood. By January 1919, their membership had dwindled to 21 and it appears the corps was disbanded.

== Sources and Further reading ==
- Magoun, Alexander. "The Wireless Women of World War I". Archived from the original on 17 May 2014.
- "Here's a New Career for Girls; Women's Radio Corps Offers It". The Evening Independent. 9 January 1919.
