= American Camouflage Corps =

40th Regiment of Engineers (Camouflage)
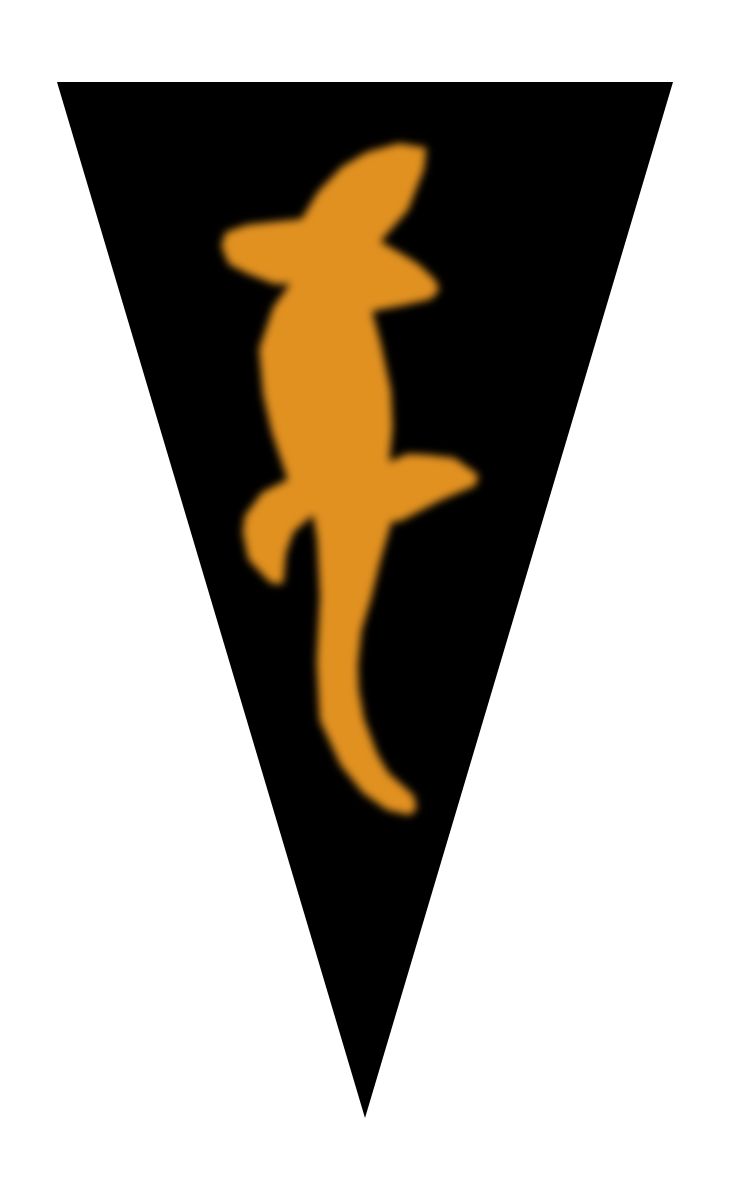
- Insignia of the 40th Regiment of Engineers
- Active: 1917–18
- Country: United States
- Branch: United States Army; Corps of Engineers
- Size: Regiment
- Engagements: World War I; Western Front

Commanders
- Commander: Captain Homer Saint-Gaudens

The American Camouflage Corps was organized in 1917 at the officers' training camp in Plattsburgh, New York, as the first such corps in the U.S. Army. Its organizers were architect Evarts Tracy of Tracy and Swartwout, and artists Wilford Conrow and Homer Saint-Gaudens.

Many of the corps' members were architects, painters and sculptors, some well known. In July 1917 Western painter Maynard Dixon visited Seattle, recruiting for the Corps among designers, scene painters, sign painters, architects, and "landscape gardeners," an effort that was coordinated through San Francisco architect Arthur Brown Jr. and the California School of Fine Arts. In Hollywood, director Cecil B. DeMille was appointed to the engineers' office to assist the continued recruitment of technical specialists, as of April 1918.

The corps sailed for Europe on January 4, 1918 under the command of Saint-Gaudens, and deployed in the field in France as Company A of the 40th Engineers. The company was "composed of artists, the majority of whom were the sons of wealthy citizens and had been especially selected for their work -- that of camouflaging. Among the things accomplished by this unit, the only American organization of its kind in France, was the camouflaging of the roads leading from Nancy and Dijon, through which thousands of women refugees, accompanied by their children, passed in safety each day." By October Saint-Gaudens had been put in charge of the Second Army's camouflage of "the line from Pont-à-Mousson to about fifteen miles south of Verdun."

== See also ==
- Women's Reserve Camouflage Corps
- The Patch King Catalogue, 1941 via the Internet Archive
