= National League for Women's Service =

US civilian volunteer organisation in the First World War

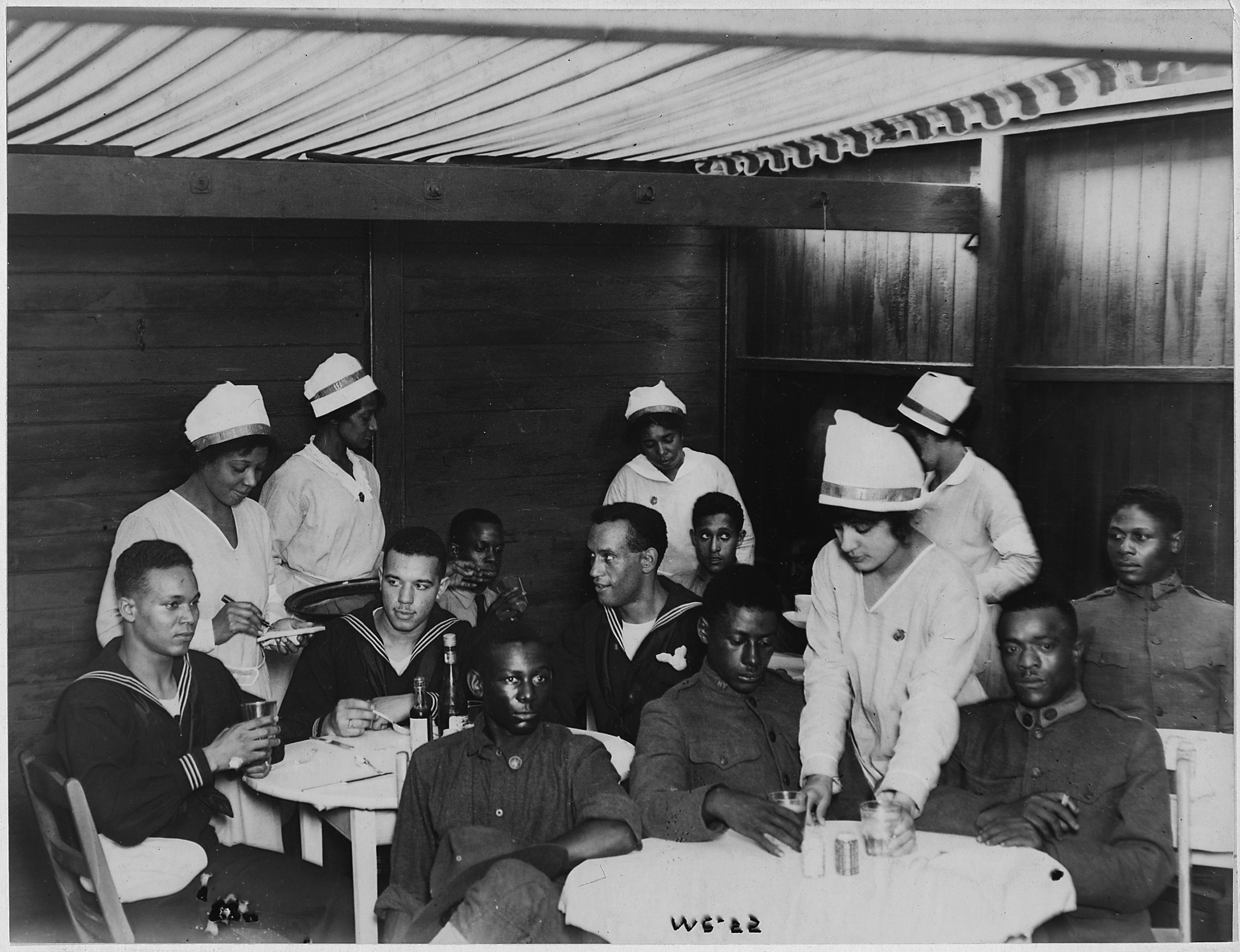
Canteen for Negro soldiers. In the canteen of the club for Negro soldiers and sailors which the National League for Women's Service has opened in New York City. The club was started at the request of Negro women who, now under the direction of the League, are managing the club and canteen.

The National League for Women's Service (NLWS) was a United States civilian volunteer organisation formed in January 1917 to provide stateside war services such as feeding, caring for and transporting soldiers, veterans and war workers and was described as "America's largest and most remarkable war emergency organization."

== Foundation ==
The National League of Women's Services (NLWS) was established in early 1917 in conjunction with the Red Cross and in anticipation of the US entering the First World War. The League was created from the Woman’s Department of the National Civic Federation readiness and relief activities and was modelled on a similar group formed in Britain, the Voluntary Aid Detachments, and was formed at the National Security League Congress of Constructive Patriotism.

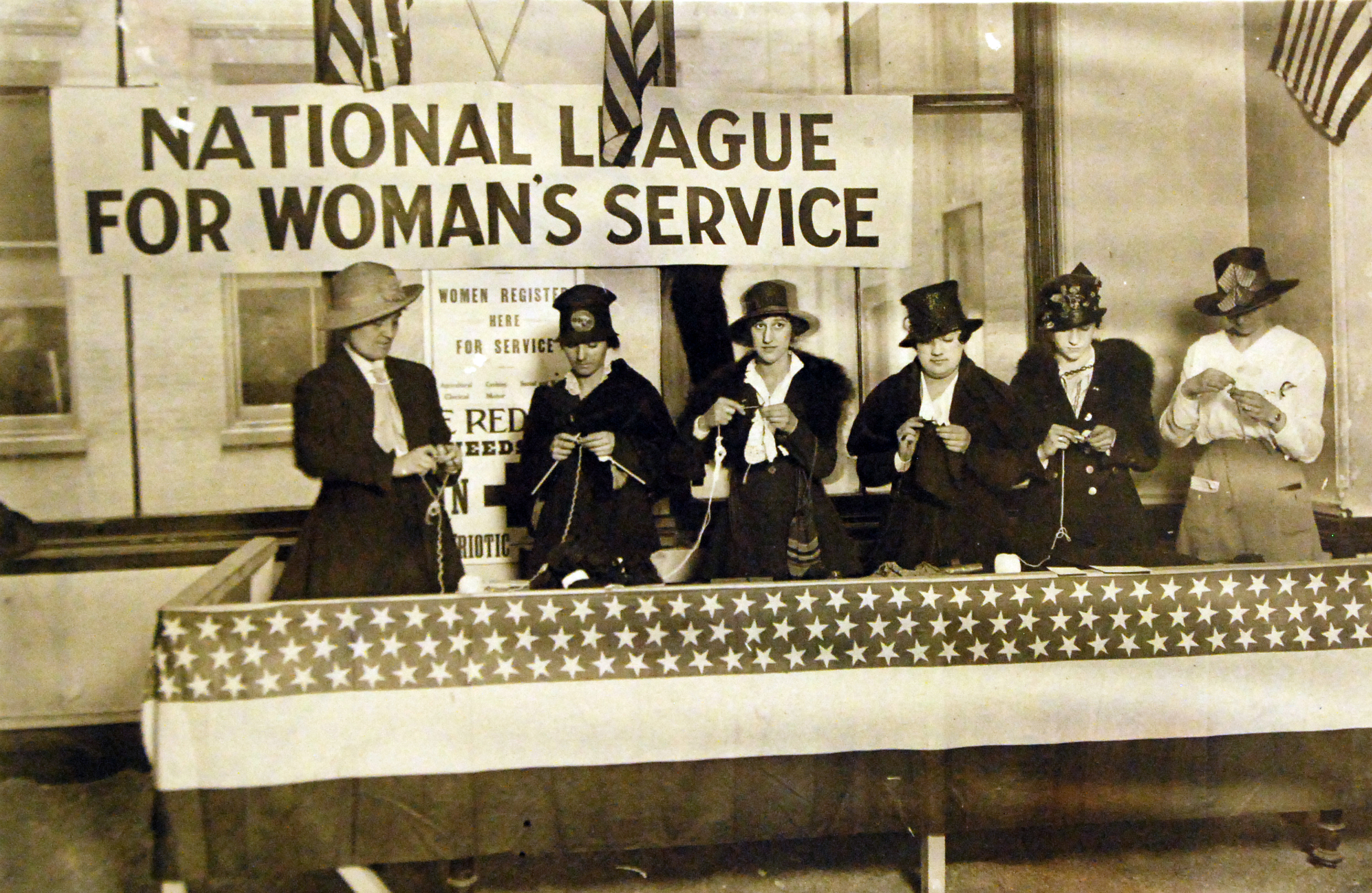
Women of the NLWS knitting

The object of the NLWS was to coordinate and standardize the work of women of America along lines of constructive patriotism; to develop the resources, to promote the efficiency of women in meeting their every-day responsibility to home, to state, to nation and to humanity; to provide organized, trained groups in every community prepared to cooperate with the Red Cross and other agencies in dealing with any calamity-fire, flood, famine, economic disorder, etc., and in time of war, to supplement the work of the Red Cross, the Army and Navy, and to deal with the questions of "Woman's Work and Woman's Welfare." The slogan of the organization was "for God, for Country, for Home."

The League was divided into thirteen national divisions: Social and Welfare, Home Economics, Agricultural, Industrial, Medical and Nursing, Motor Driving, General Service, Health, Civics, Signalling, Map-reading, Wireless and Telegraphy, and Camping.

It also sponsored the women who formed the Women's Reserve Camouflage Corps, working to disguise both equipment and soldiers through the art of disguise. Generally, the NLWS was predicated on a military-type regimen of training and drilling. When unrestricted submarine warfare was initiated by Germany in January, 1917, the NLWS accelerated their plans to register women and prepare them to take the place of men that would be needed for fighting. Some members of the NLWS wore uniforms and used military designations.

== Wireless training ==
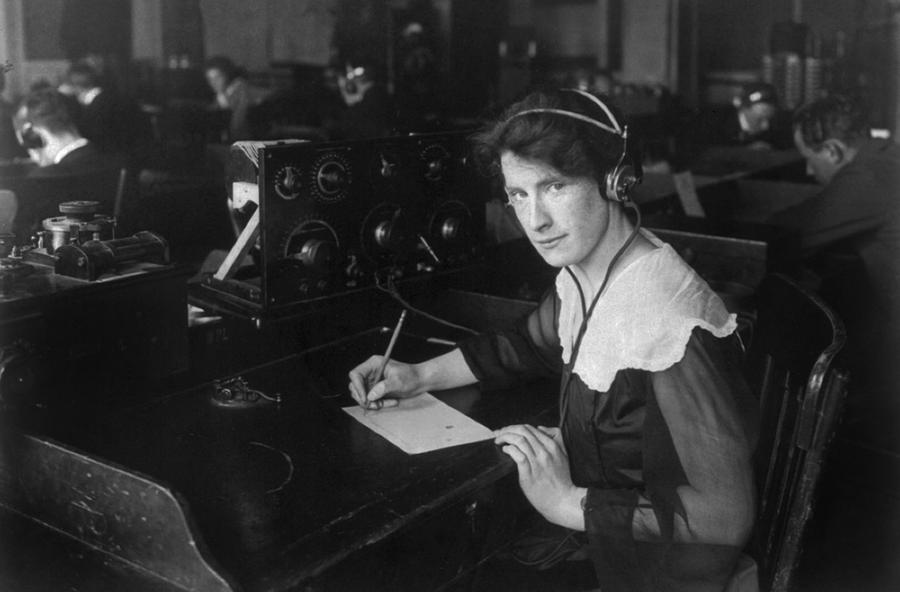
Helen Campbell, a wireless operator was recruited by the National League for Women's Service, a World War I government program to use women to fill jobs vacated by men drafted into the military. 1917.

On 7 March 1917, and while the US was "on the brink" of entering the war—war was declared just under a month later, on 2 April—the NLWS established a training program for female wireless operators at Hunter College in New York. The course director was Edna Owen (generally credited under her husband's name, Mrs Herbert Sumner Owen) who was also chairman of the NLWS's wireless division and founder of the Women's Radio Corps, a branch of the US Army Signal Corps.

The first student to graduate was Ms Helen Campbell, shown right, with another early graduate being Elise Van R. Owen, shown in a June 1917 newspaper article testing a receiving set at the wireless school at Hunter College.

Women were trained to use wireless telegraph instruments to work for the US government or private companies and to take the place of male wireless operators who had gone to war.

== Work abroad ==
The work of the NLWS was often focused on Europe and the NLWS worked with the Belgian Relief and American Committee for Devastated France. One of the more interesting projects of the NLWS was the "re-chickening" of France and some branches sponsored whole chicken farms in France to aid in the food shortage there.

Many of the branches worked in providing clothing for Belgian refugees, particularly children. They collaborated with the Woman’s Section of the Navy Service League in knitting, not only for American soldiers and sailors, but also for needy overseas. The women also participated in the "kid glove" project in which they donated their kid gloves which were made into vests and jackets for American servicemen.

The NLWS also contributed to efforts for food conservation and provided food during the influenza epidemic in 1918.

== Sources and Further reading ==
- Clarke, Ida Clyde (1918). American Women and the World War. New York; London: D. Appleton and Company.
- James, Bessie Rowland (1920). For God, for Country, for Home: the National League for Woman's Service. G.P. Putnam's Sons.
- Stevenson, Shanna. "National League for Woman's Service: Minute Women of Washington".
- "The National League of Women's Services". Archived from the original on 8 May 2014.
