= Edna Owen =

US wireless operator trainer during the First World War

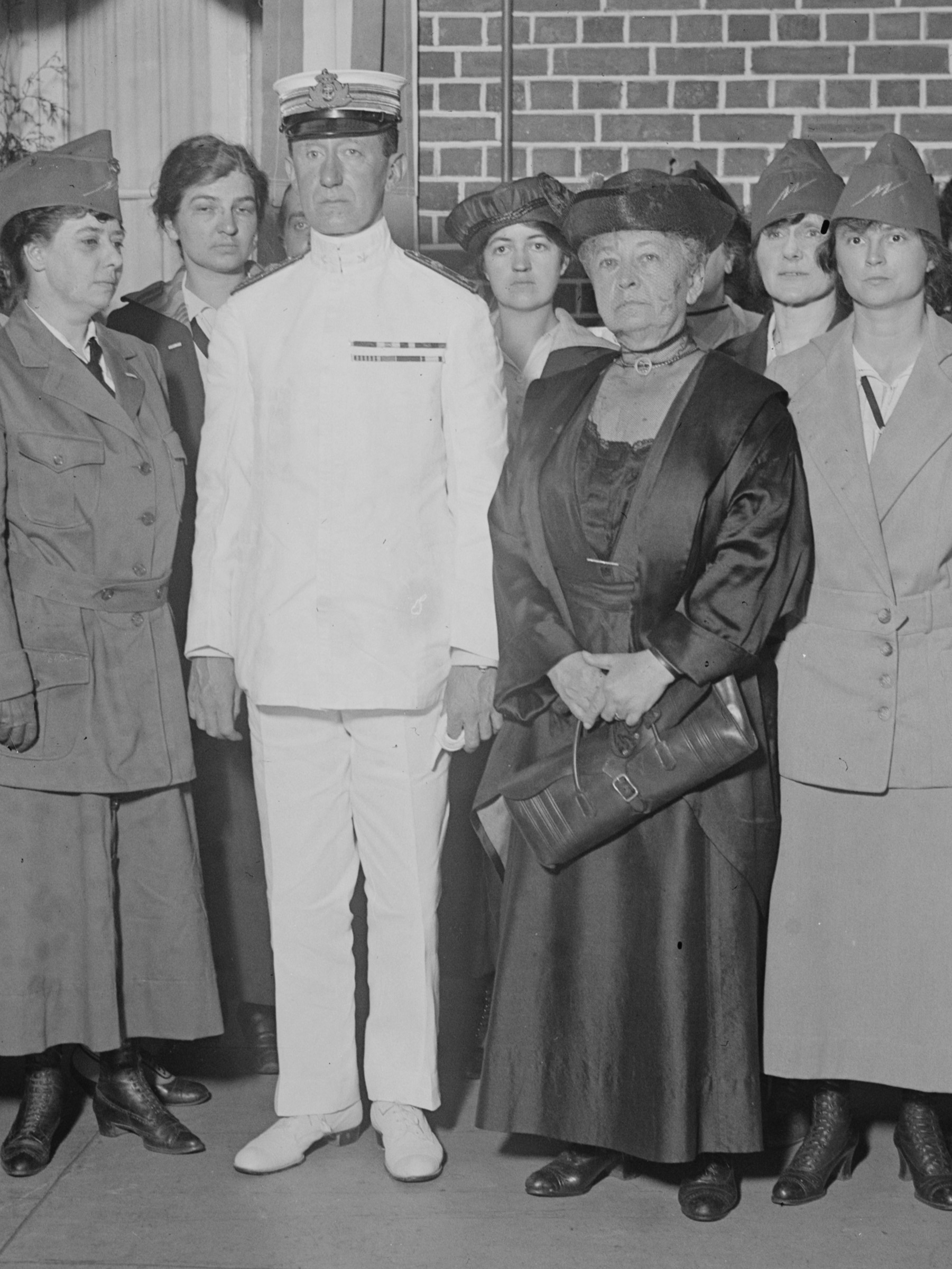
Guglielmo Marconi and Edna Owen in 1917 with Hunter College students enrolled in a radio class for women wireless telegraphers.

Edna Owen (more generally referred to by her married name Mrs Herbert Sumner Owen) (1859–1936) was an American suffragist probably best known for her contributions to the training of female wireless operators in the US during World War I. She was the director of the wireless training course run by the National League for Women's Service at Hunter College, New York; trained female wireless operators at the YWCA in New York City; and was a founder and chairman of the Women's Radio Corps.

== Early life and marriage ==
Edna Owen (more generally referred to by her married name Mrs Herbert Sumner Owen) (1859–1936) was born Erna von Rodenstein in 1859 and in 1890 married Herbert Sumner Owen, a businessman, early cyclist, and Mayflower descendant, in Utah. While in Utah, Owen campaigned against polygamy before they moved east to New York and, more generally, was an ardent suffragette.

== Wireless work in World War I ==
In March 1917 and less than a month before the US entered World War I, Owen was appointed the director of a wireless training course for women organised by the National League for Women's Service at Hunter College, New York. Owen was also chairman of the wireless division of the National League for Woman's Service.

Owen was also one of the co-founders of the Women's Radio Corps, attached to the US Army Signal Corps and established to train women as wireless operators during the war. Throughout the war, Owen also ran a radio training class at the YWCA in New York where alumni included Belle Baruch.

A mere six days after the US entered the war in April 1917, Owen offered to provide 500 licensed female wireless operators in six months. In order to achieve this highly ambitious goal, Owen campaigned tirelessly to add recruits, lecturing up to 200 young women at once in lectures in New York and Washington, D.C., on the "many wonderful opportunities" brought by the occasion of the "great world war. . . . [I]t is your duty to prepare yourselves in order that you may set men free, that they may go to the front and fight for you and yours."

Owen's daughter Elise Owen was one of her mother's trainee wireless operators and later one of the early generation of female pilots in the US and a flight instructor during World War II.

== Sources and Further reading ==
- Magoun, Alexander. "The Wireless Women of World War I". Archived from the original on 17 May 2014.
