= Helen Hobart =

American artist (b. 1892)

Helen Hobart, Candlestick, c. 1939, Index of American Design, National Gallery of Art, Washington, DC.

Helen Hobart (b. 1892, Massachusetts) was an American artist known for her service in the Women's Reserve Camouflage Corps, and for her illustrations for the Index of American Design. These illustrations are part of the collection in the National Gallery of Art.
