= Women's Reserve Camouflage Corps =

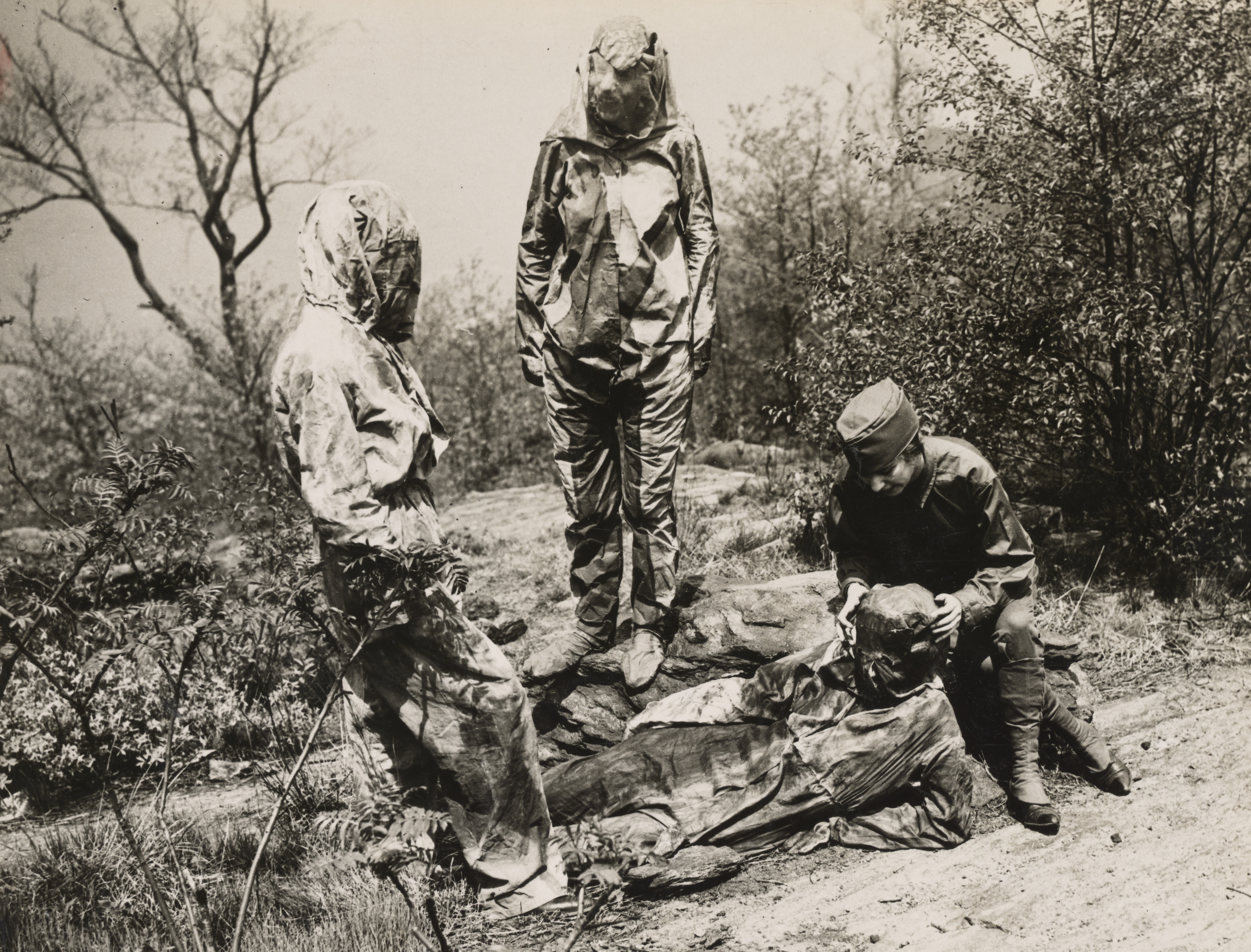
Women's Reserve Camouflage Corps in camouflage suits

The Women's Reserve Camouflage Corps was a specialized unit of American women artists formed during World War I to design and test camouflage techniques for the military. They created both clothing and disguised military equipment for the war effort. Disbanded at the end of the war, women volunteered again to work on camouflage projects in World War II.

== History ==
In 1917, British artist Norman Wilkinson submitted a proposal to the Royal Navy to paint optical illusions of geometric shapes, known as dazzle camouflage, to disguise ships. His designs were created in his London studio by 5 designers and painted by a crew of 11 women artists, known as camoufleurs. Between the spring of 1917 and November 1918, the women had painted more than 2,300 vessels. Thousands of women in France were employed as camoufleurs painting guns for the British army by 1917, while others worked with the American forces, making nets to hide artillery and garlands to string through trees and uniforms. For the nets and garlands, brown and green burlap, dyed to match the foliage, was sewn by the women into wire and fishnet tenting to drape over or in front of machinery. The uniforms covered soldiers from head to foot in a burlap suit embellished with raffia palm fronds. The French women also used dazzle camouflage to disguise buildings at the American camp.

As men were called to the military front, American women artists began to replace men who had worked on camouflage projects for the military. British and French women camoufleurs inspired the United States to begin training women for the Women's Reserve Camouflage Corps, though the initial female applicants were refused by the military. In November and December, 1917, newspapers began advertising for women artists with experience as sculptors, or scene and landscape painting, to join a training program organized in Marshfield Hills, Massachusetts. By November, around 75 women had joined the venture and were increasing at a rate of 1 to 4 women per day. The unit hired Lieutenant Ledyard Towle to train the women, and was soon recruiting women as photographers as well, to verify differences between photographic and observed deceptions. On April 1, 1918, the Women's Reserve Camouflage Corps were formed by about forty artists from New York and Philadelphia.

The women initially focused their efforts on creating apparel for gunners, scouts, and snipers that made them blend in with the landscape's trees or rocks. Weekly field trips to Westchester County and parks such as Van Cortlandt Park and Kykuit, the Rockefeller family estate, served as testing grounds for the women to try out their designs, trying to see if they could fool passerby or if their photographs showed they had succeeded in making people disappear from view. They eventually moved from clothing to painting dazzle camouflage on ambulances, ships and tanks. Units formed in various places throughout the United States, including Iowa, Minnesota, North and South Dakota, and Philadelphia.

Women participating in the program, which was sponsored through the National League for Women's Service, were volunteers and paid their own expenses. Margaret DeVoe White a noted sculptor who pioneered a wax-relief type of sculpture, headed the units formed in Iowa, the Dakotas and Minnesota. Other known camoufleurs include Eleanor Arnett, Dorthea Fischer, Katherine Munoz and Elizabeth Pilsbury, all of Philadelphia; Clara Lathrop Strong of Massachusetts; and Clara Armstrong, Edith Barry, Marguerite Becht, Diana Cauffman, Constance Cochrane, Edith Cohen, Evelyn Curtis, Frances Forbush, Sarah Furman, Patricia Gay, Myra Hanford, Helen Harrison, Helen F. Hobart, Helen Kalkman, Louise Larned, Ellen Macmillan, H. Rosalie Manning, Marie H. Moran, Dorothy Murphy, Rose Stokes, Eloise P. Valiant, Gertrude Welling and Bertha Wilson, all whom worked in New York City.

== Legacy ==
Though the Camouflage Corps were disbanded after the war ended, during World War II, women returned to work on camouflage netting. Women in Australia, Britain, New Zealand and the United states worked on nets in their homes before their fabrics were sent to the front lines.

== Photos ==
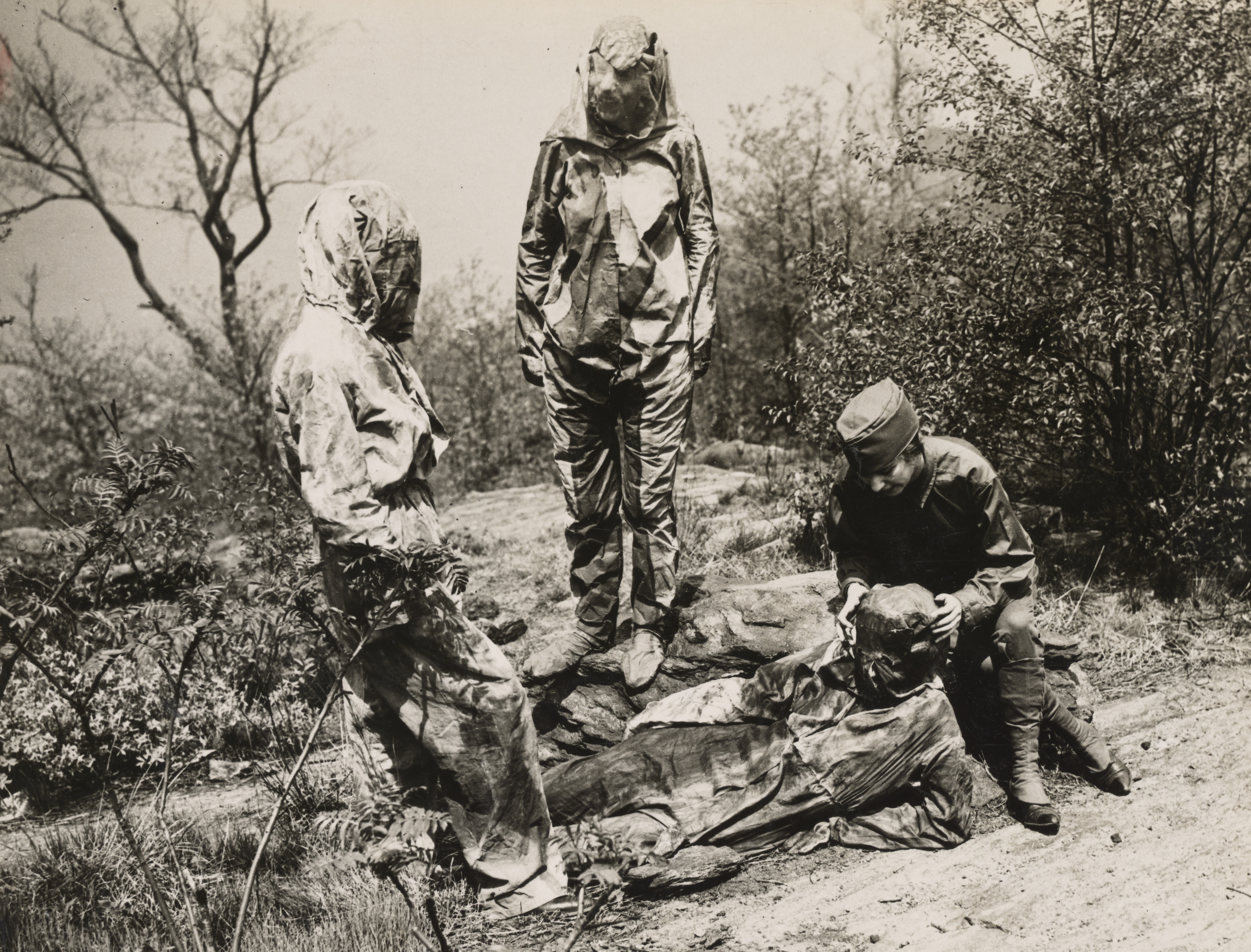

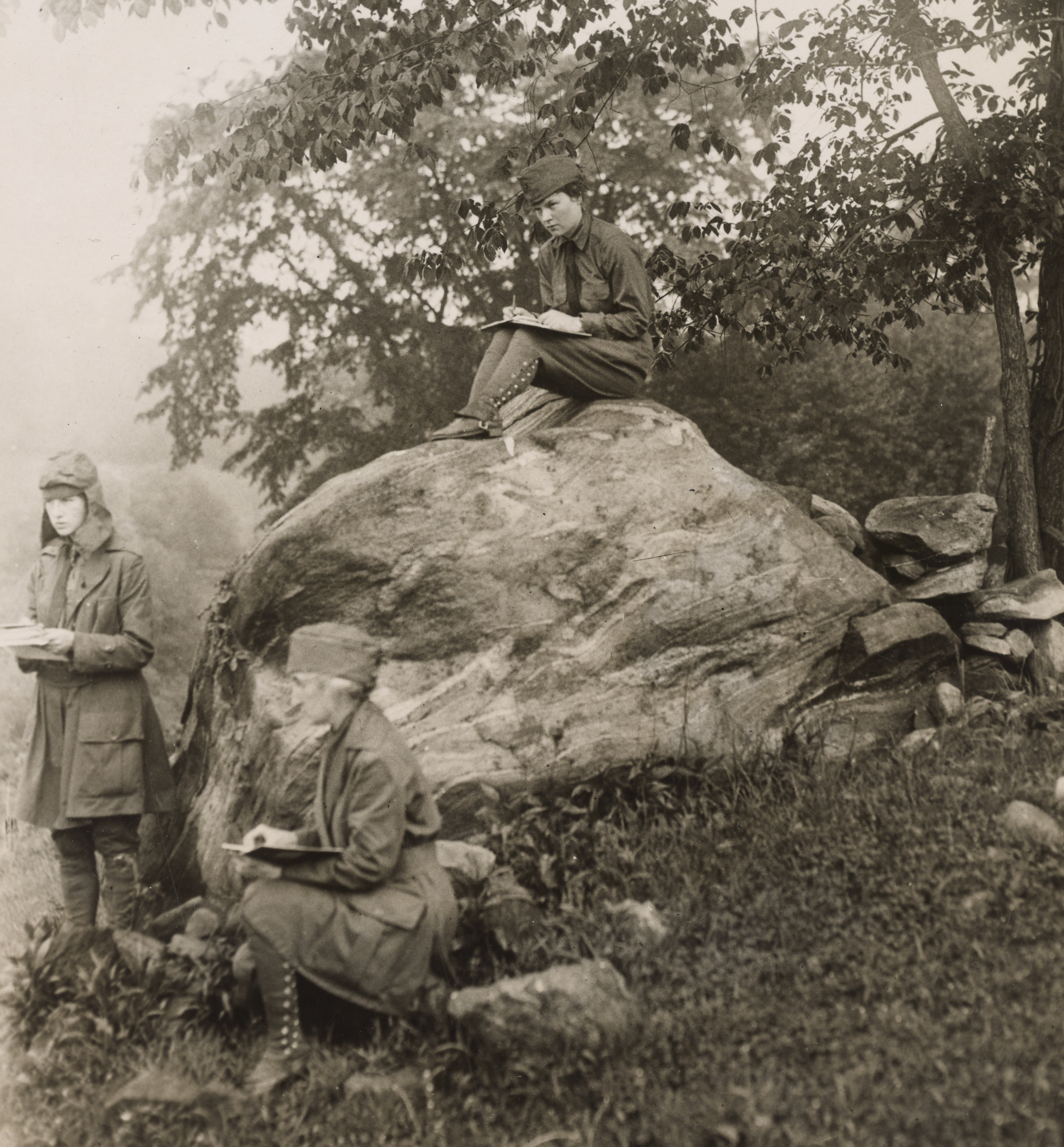

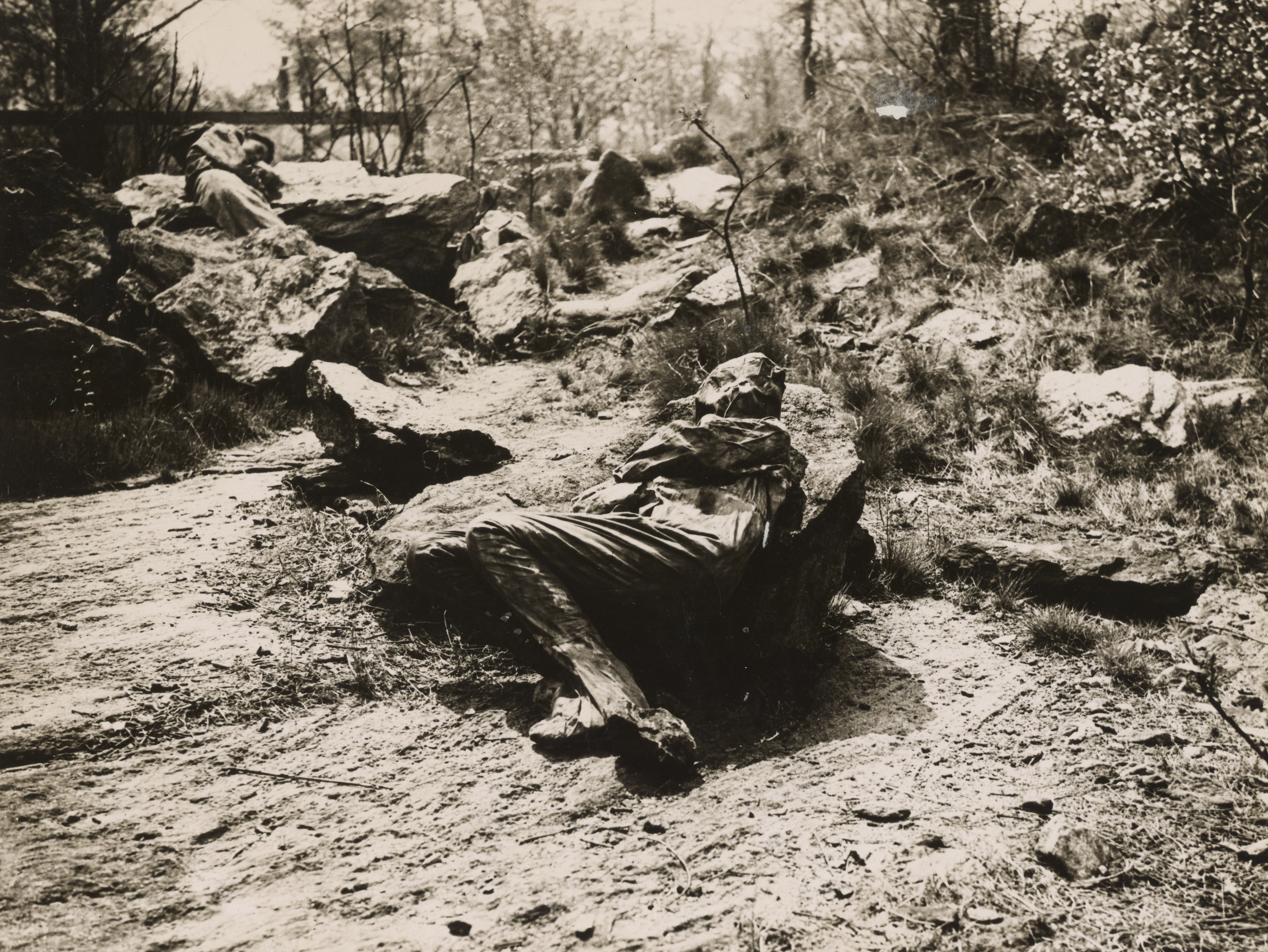

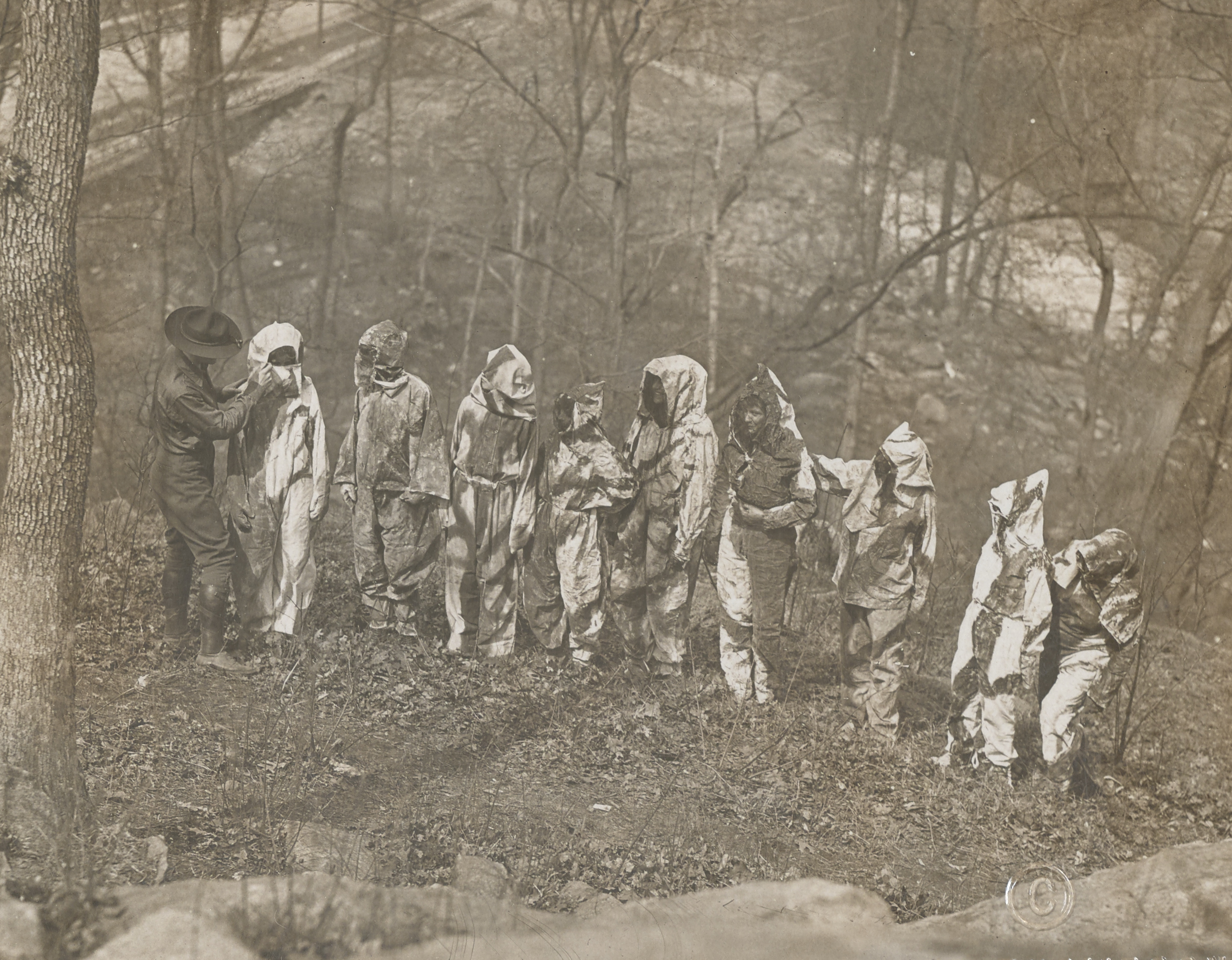

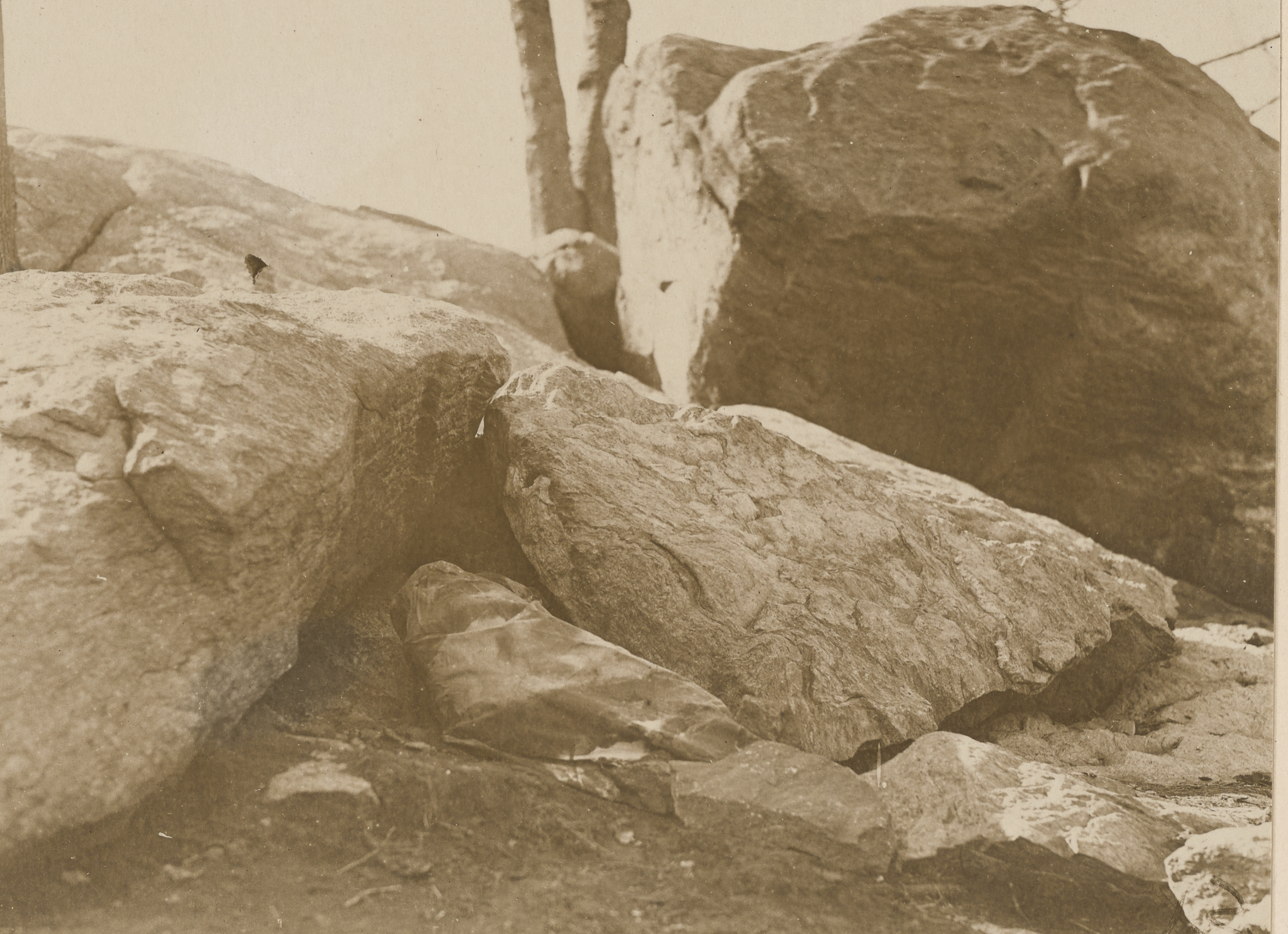

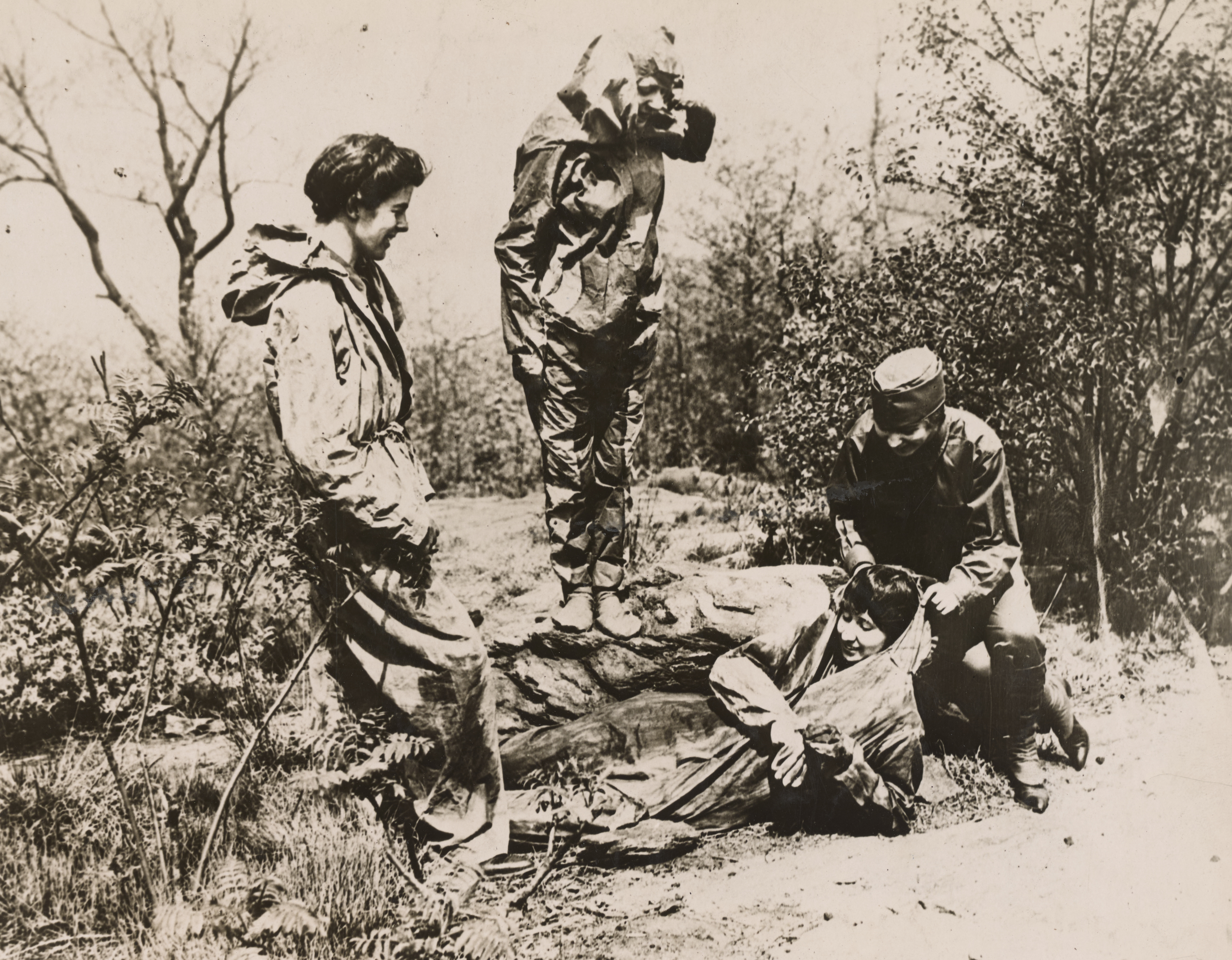

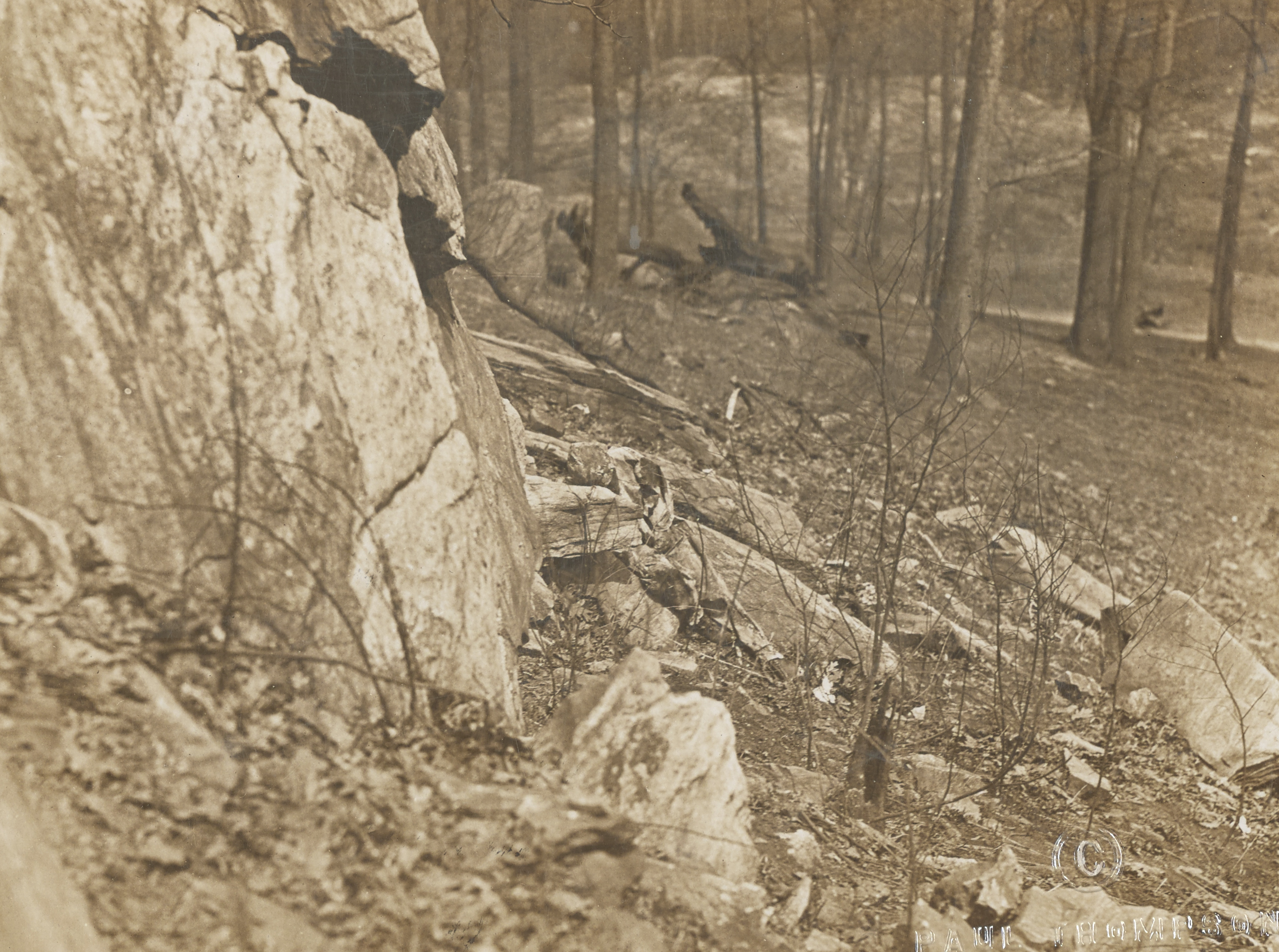

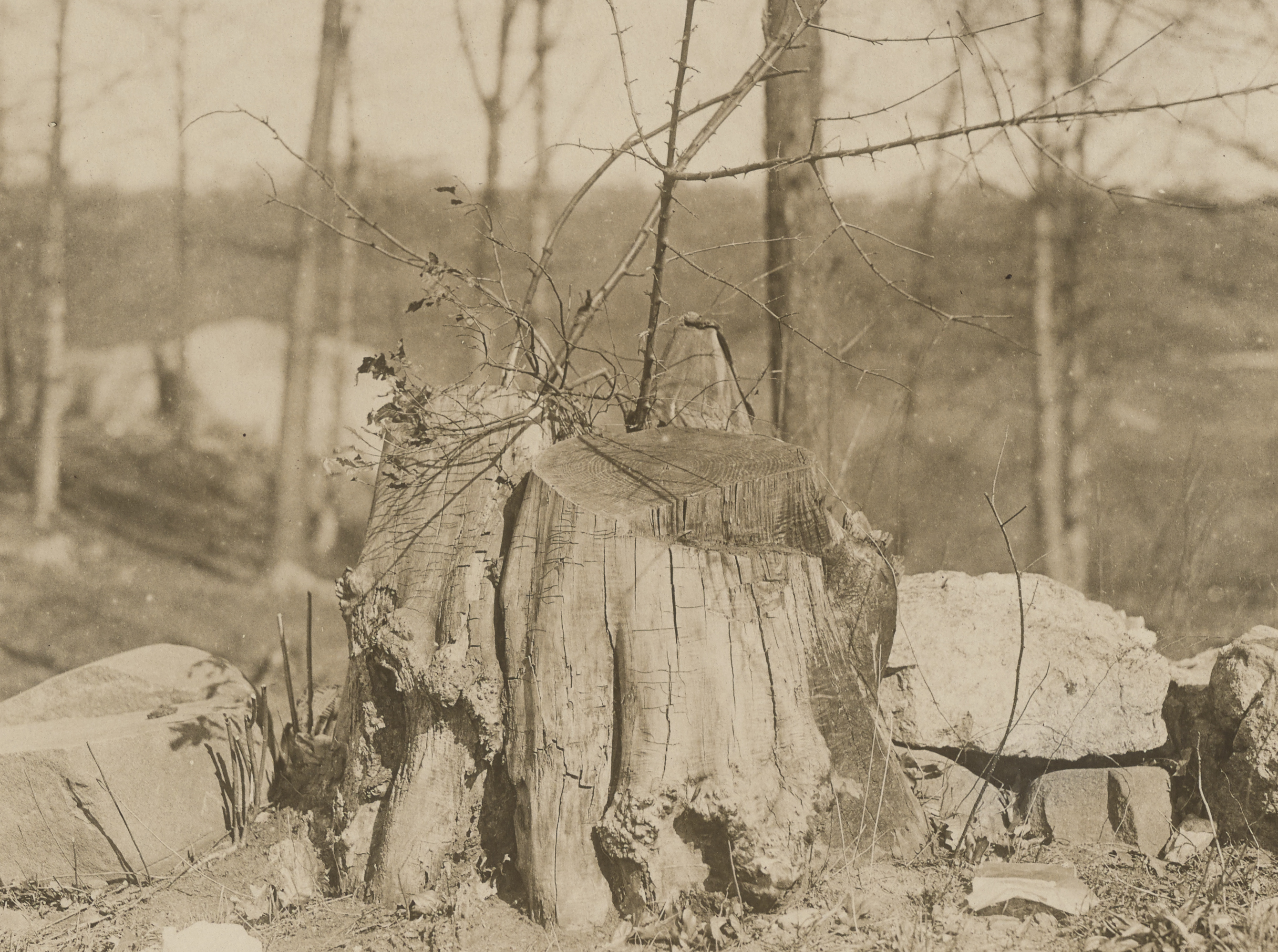

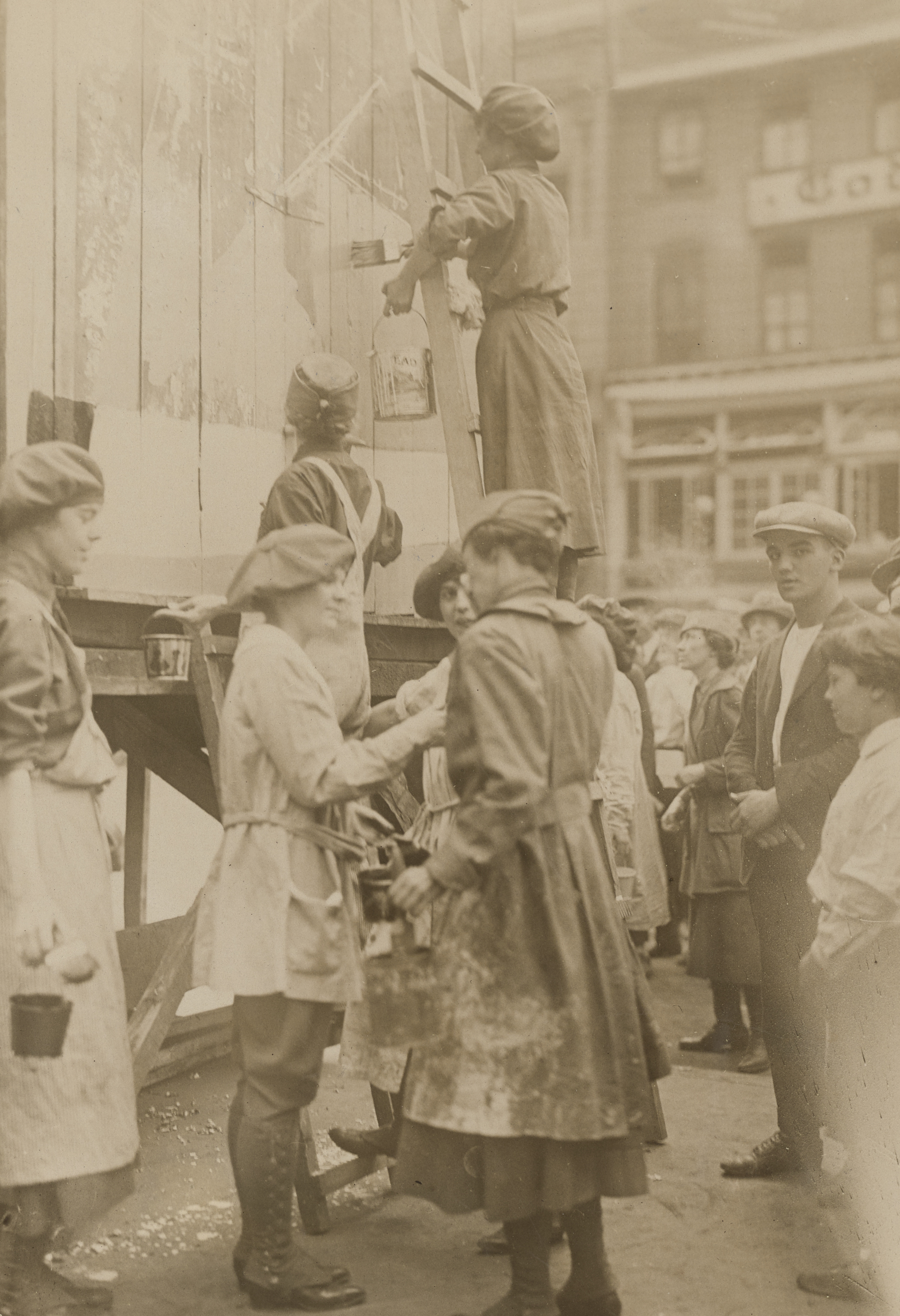

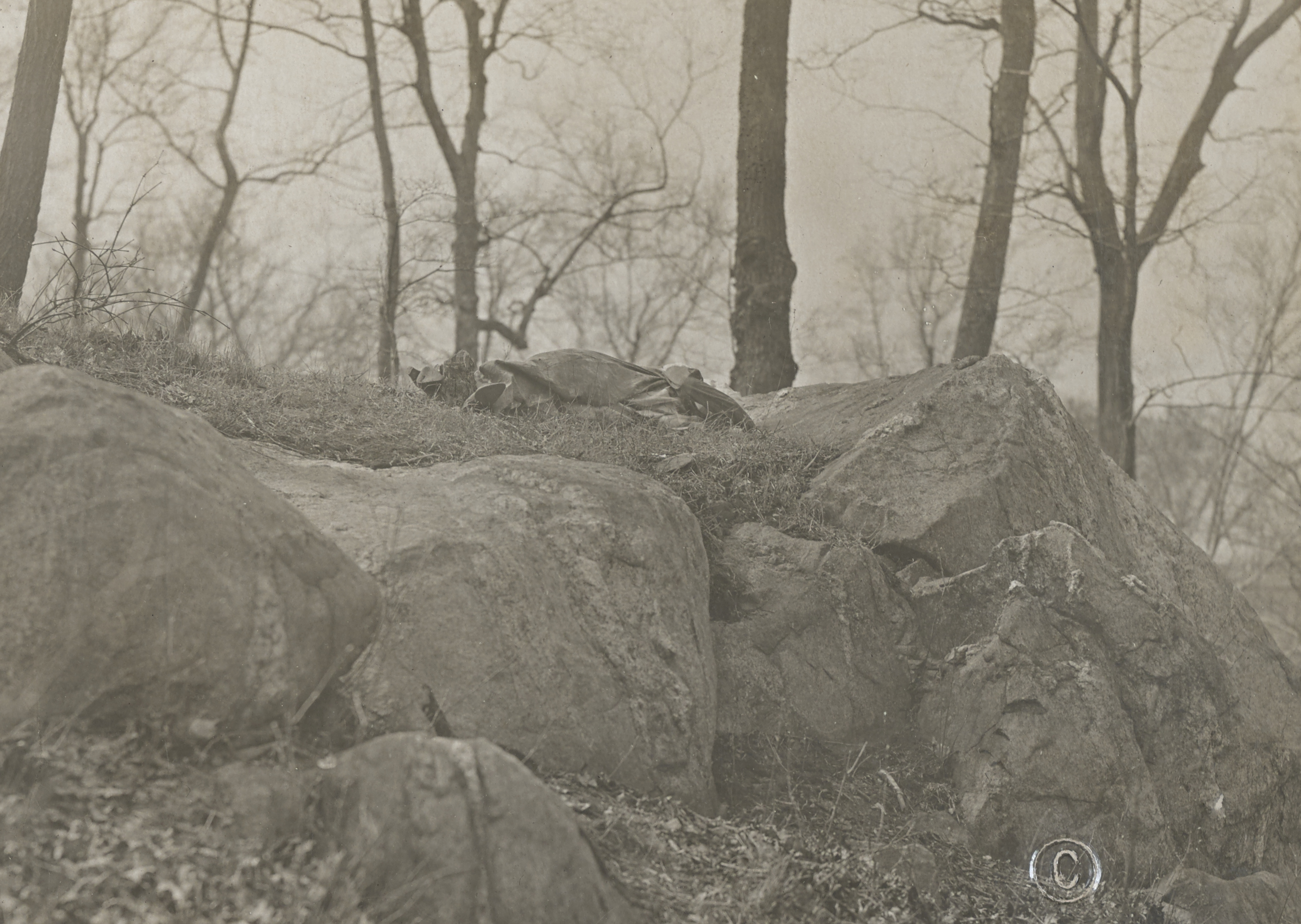

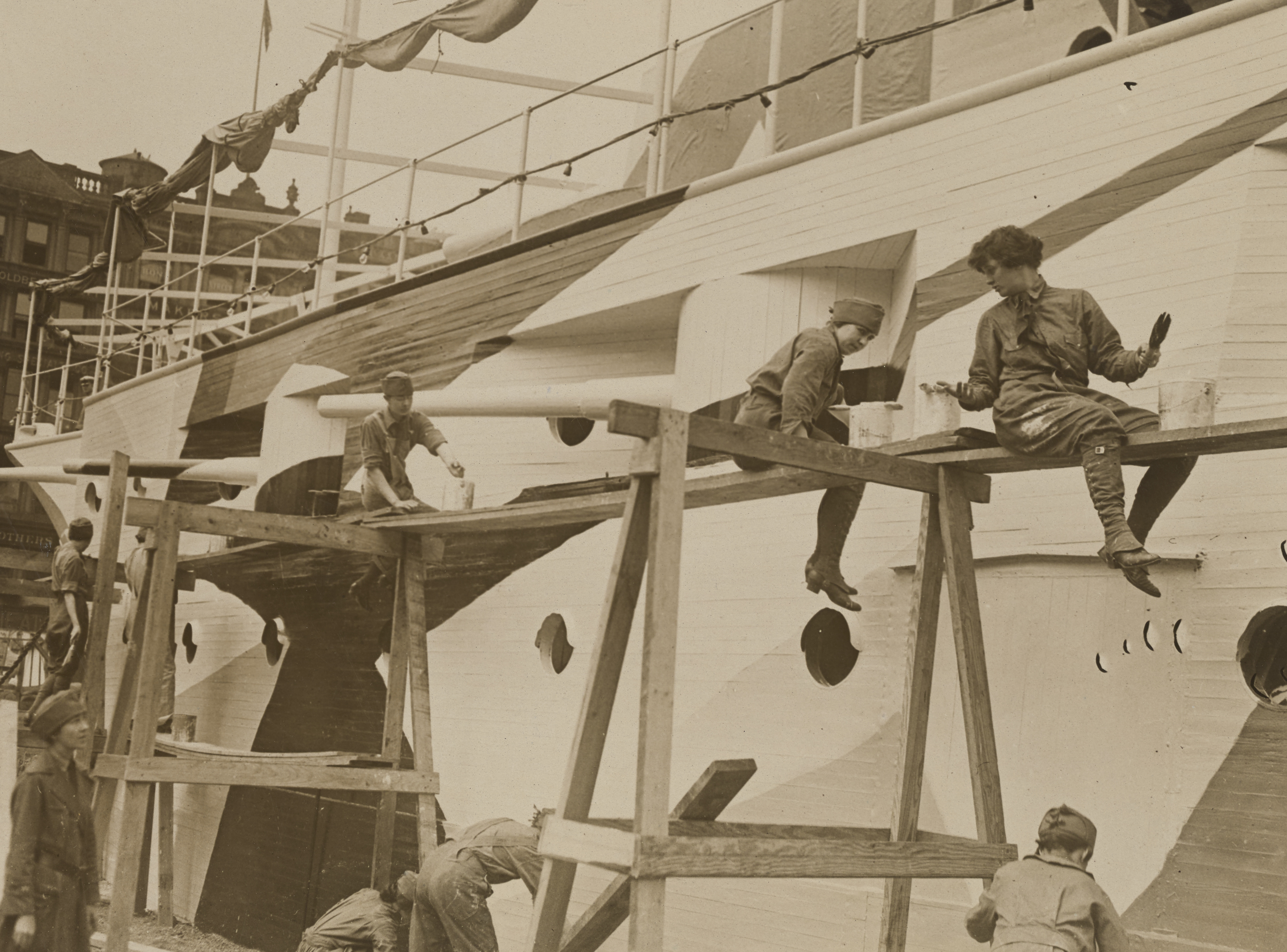

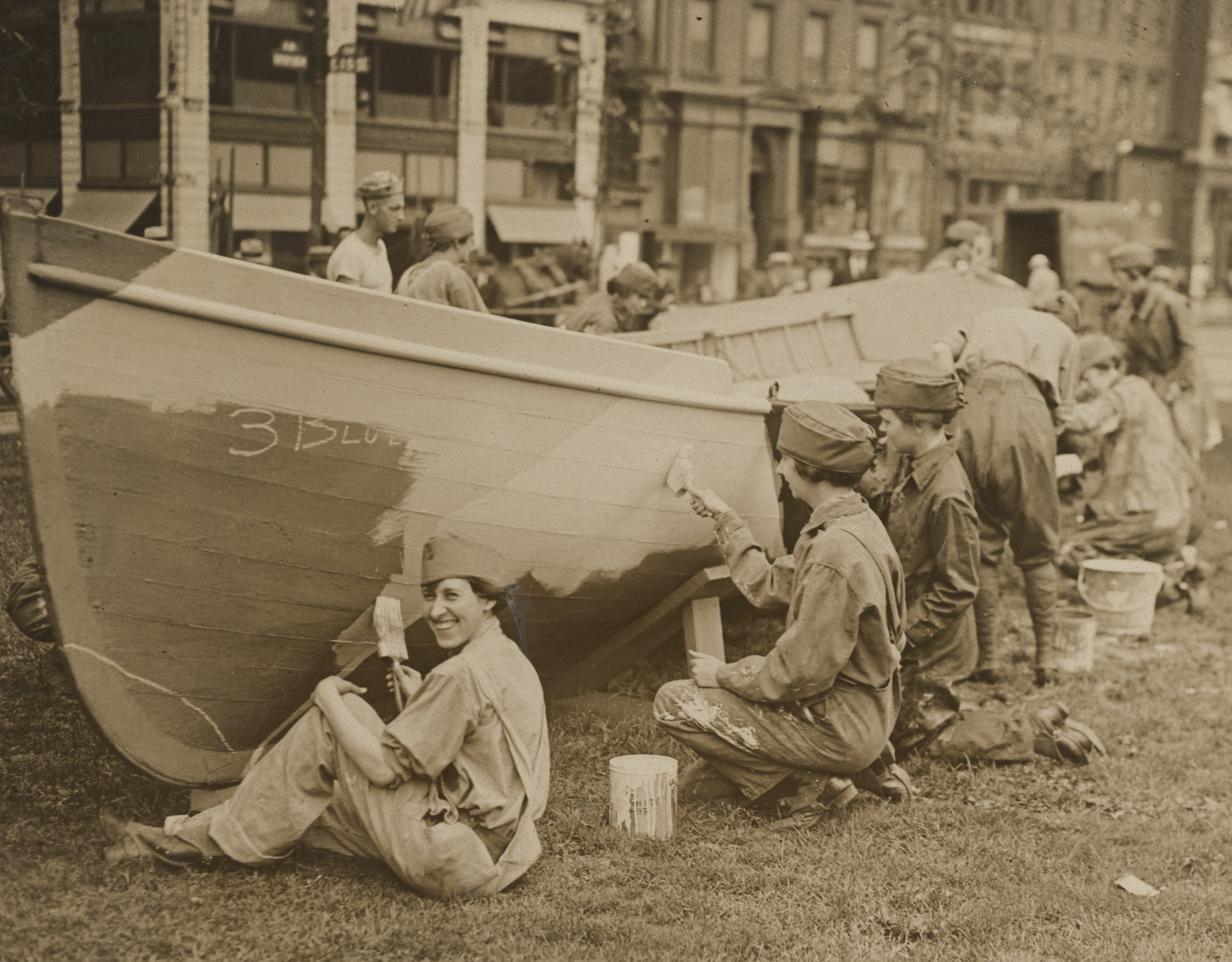

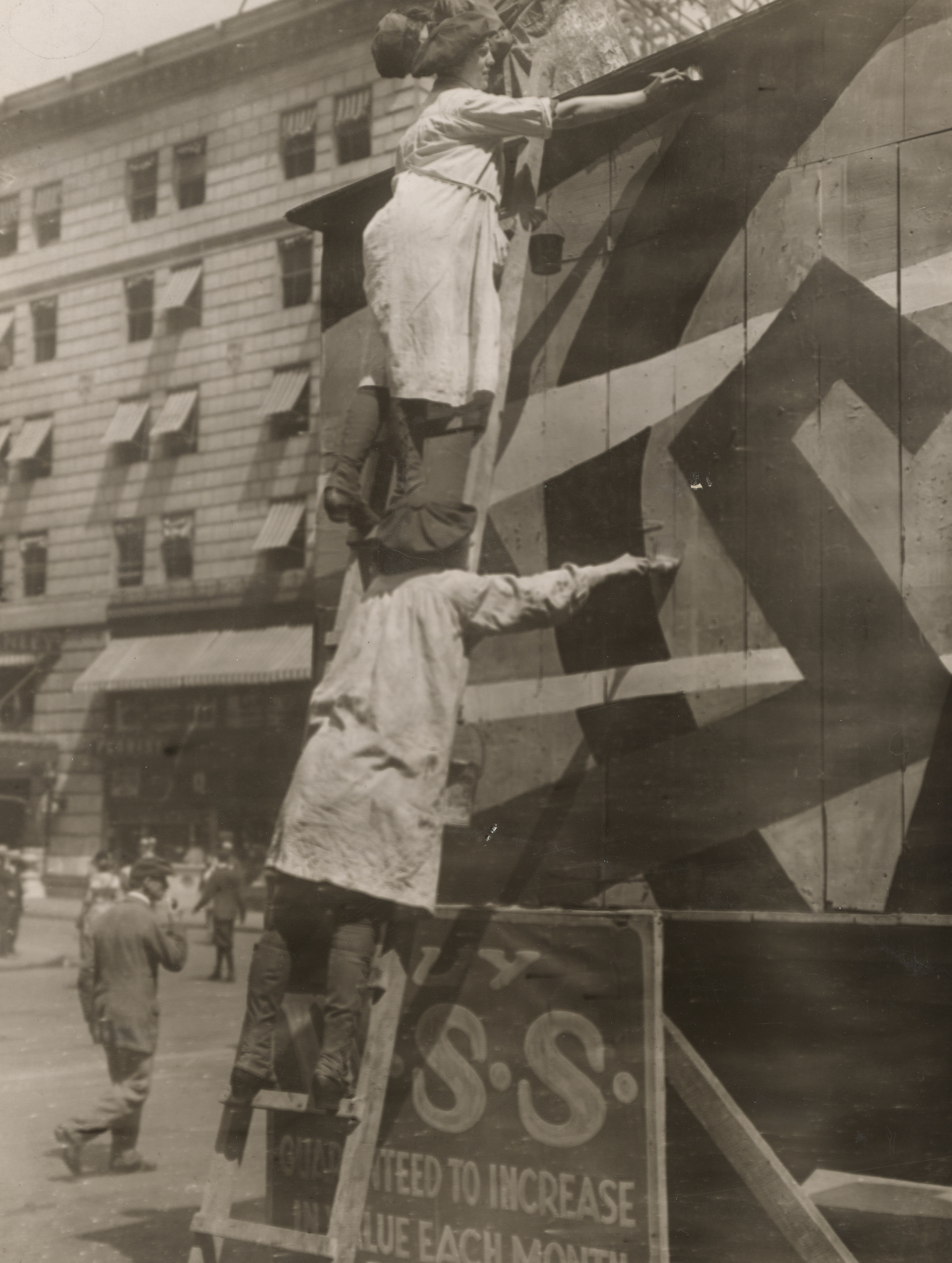

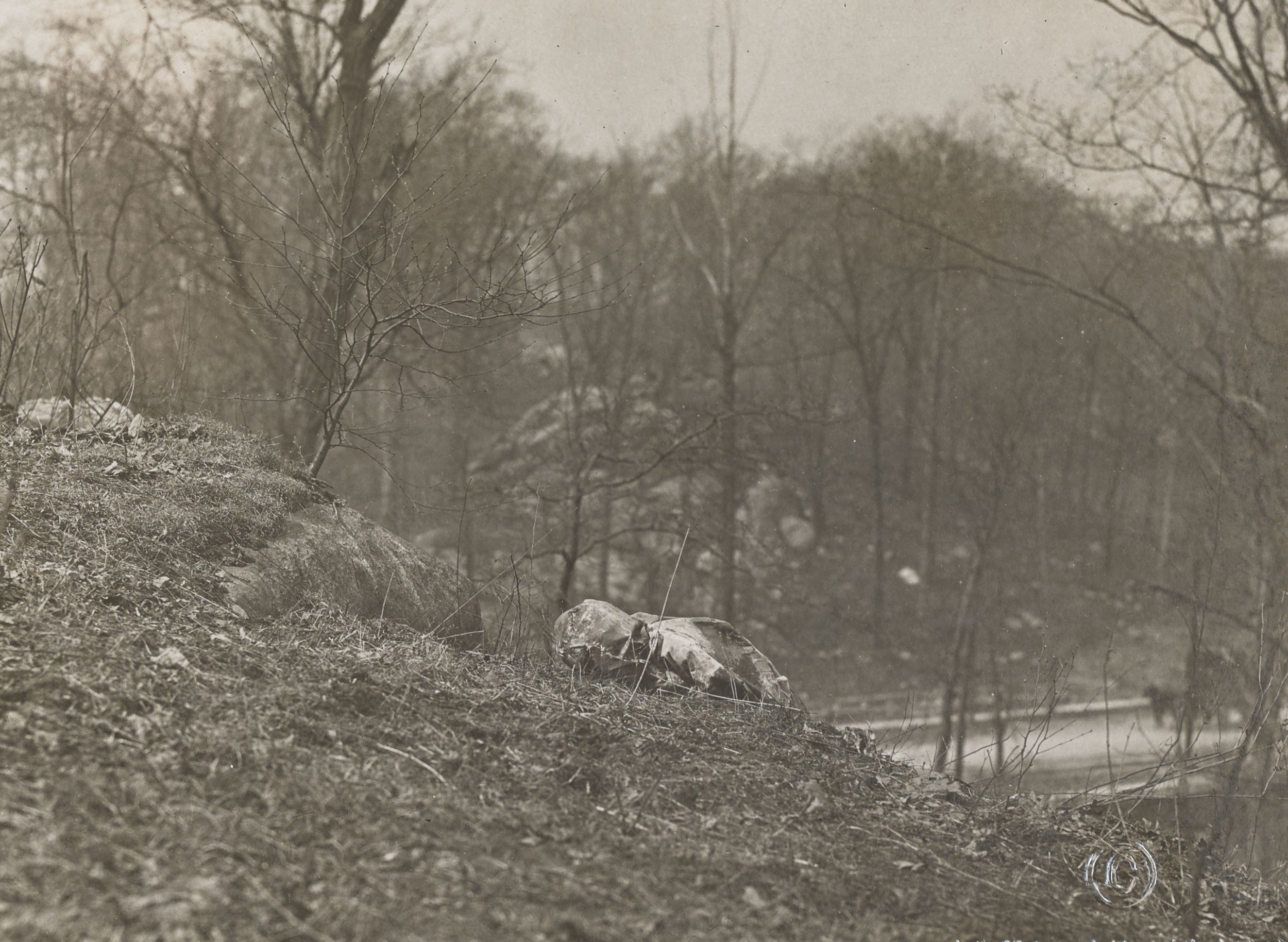

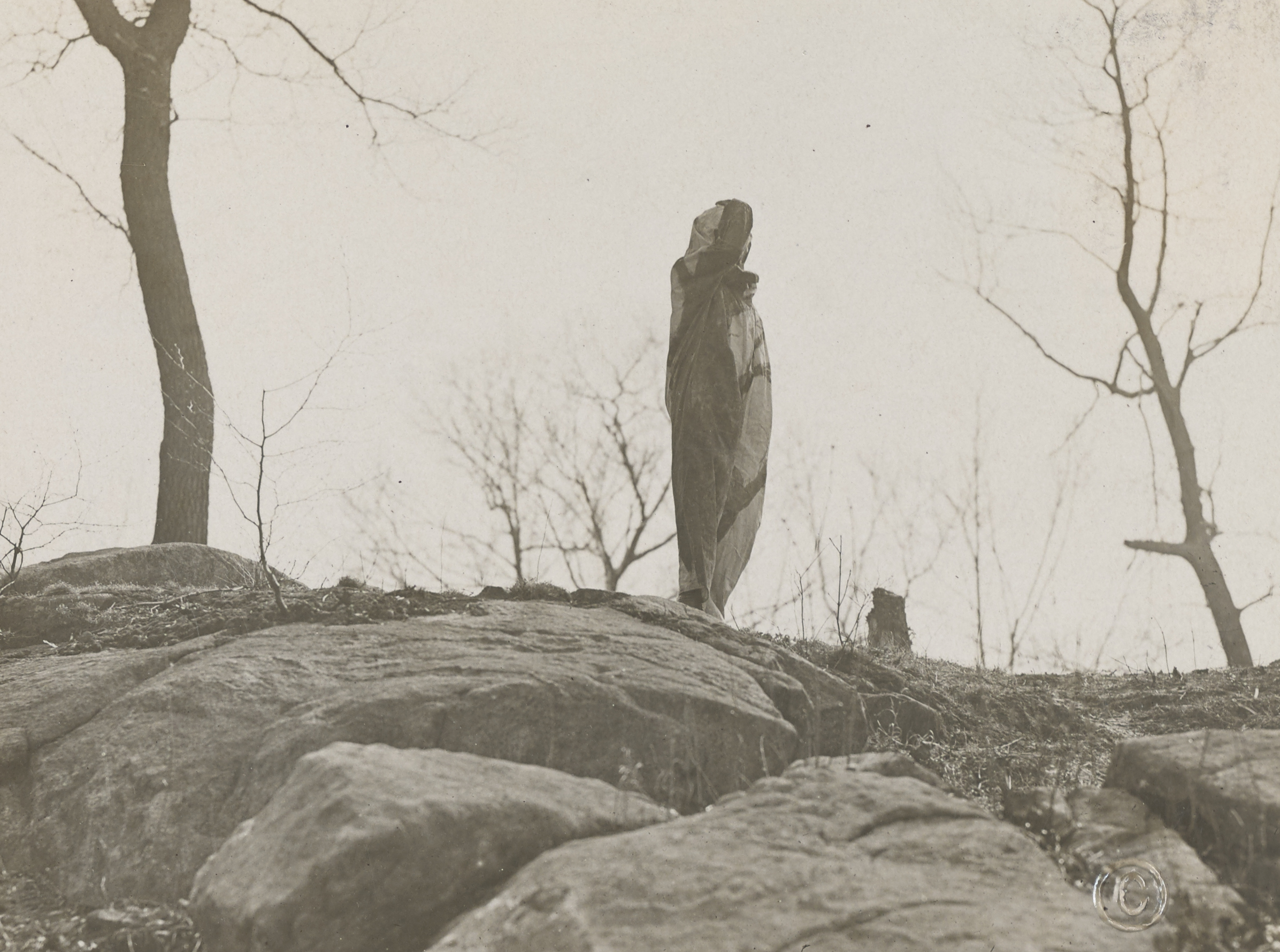

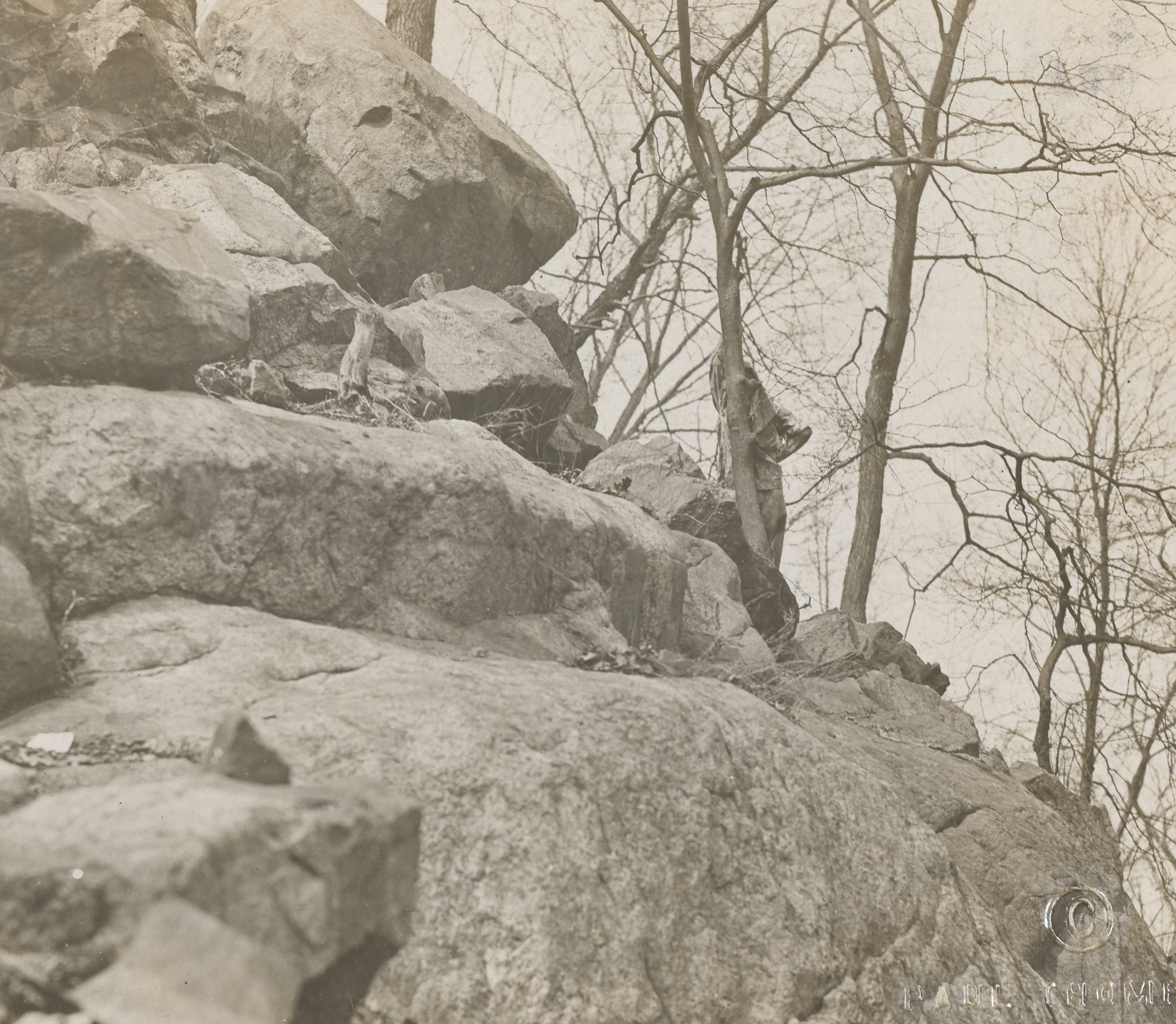

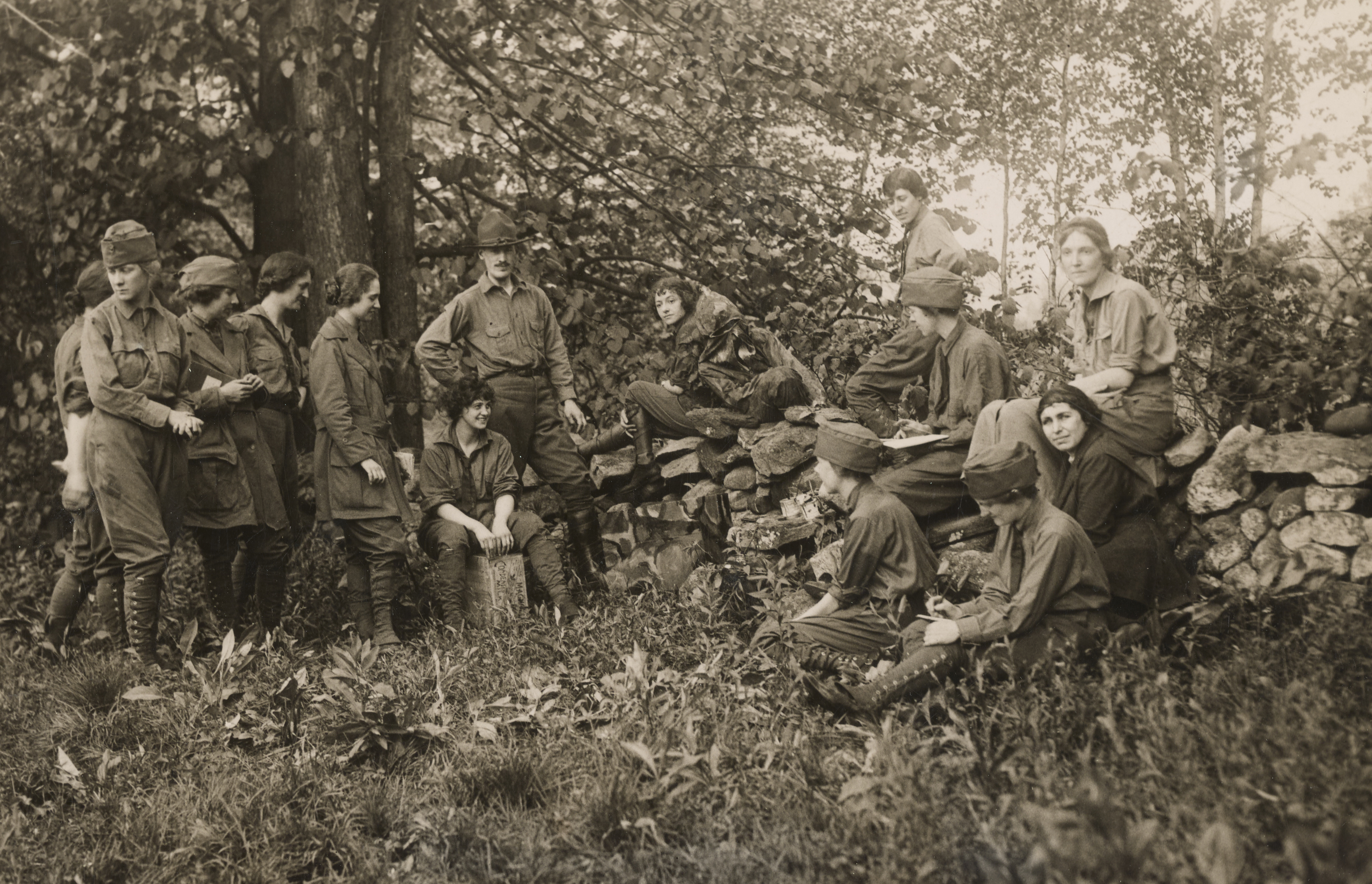

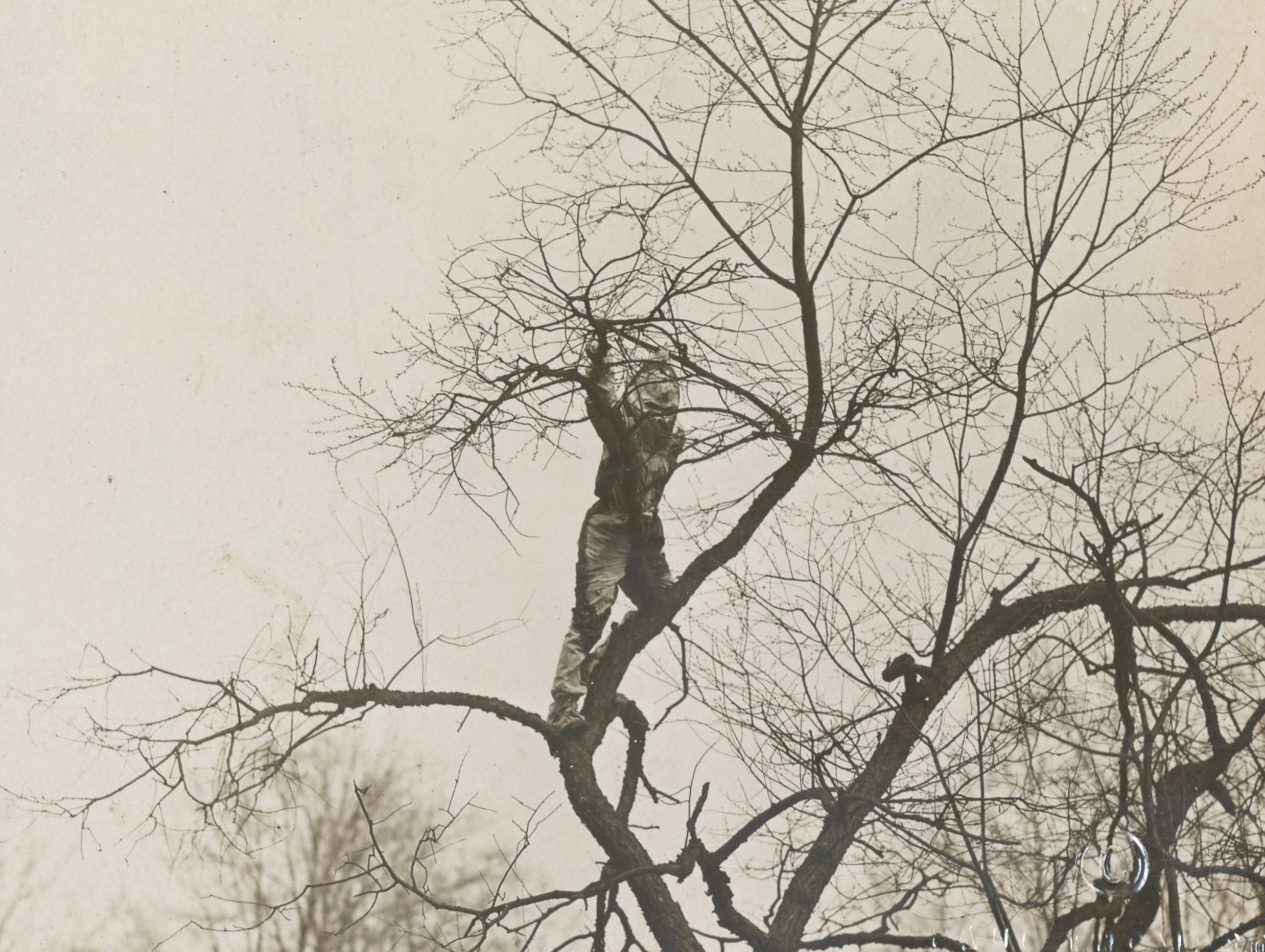

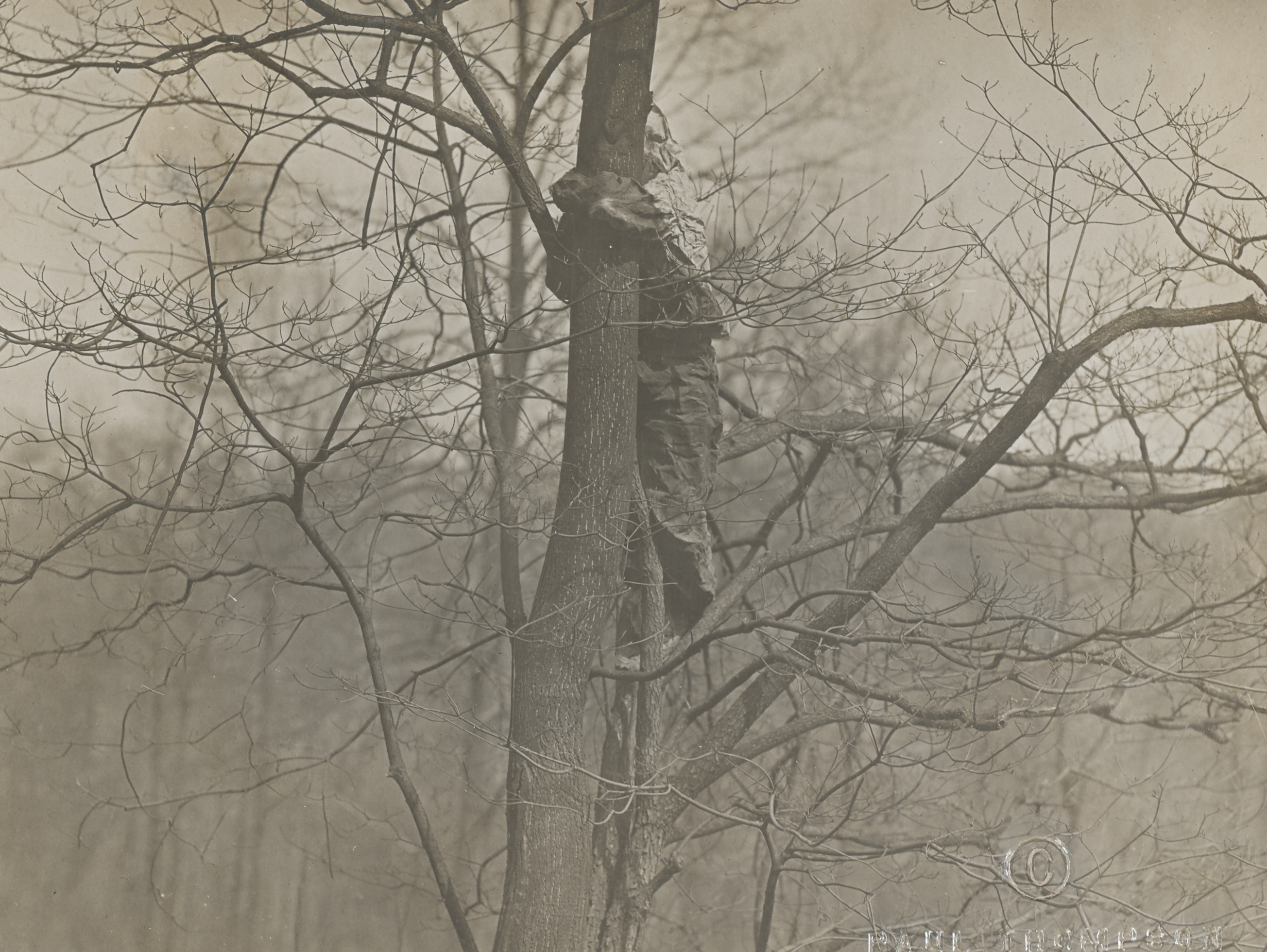

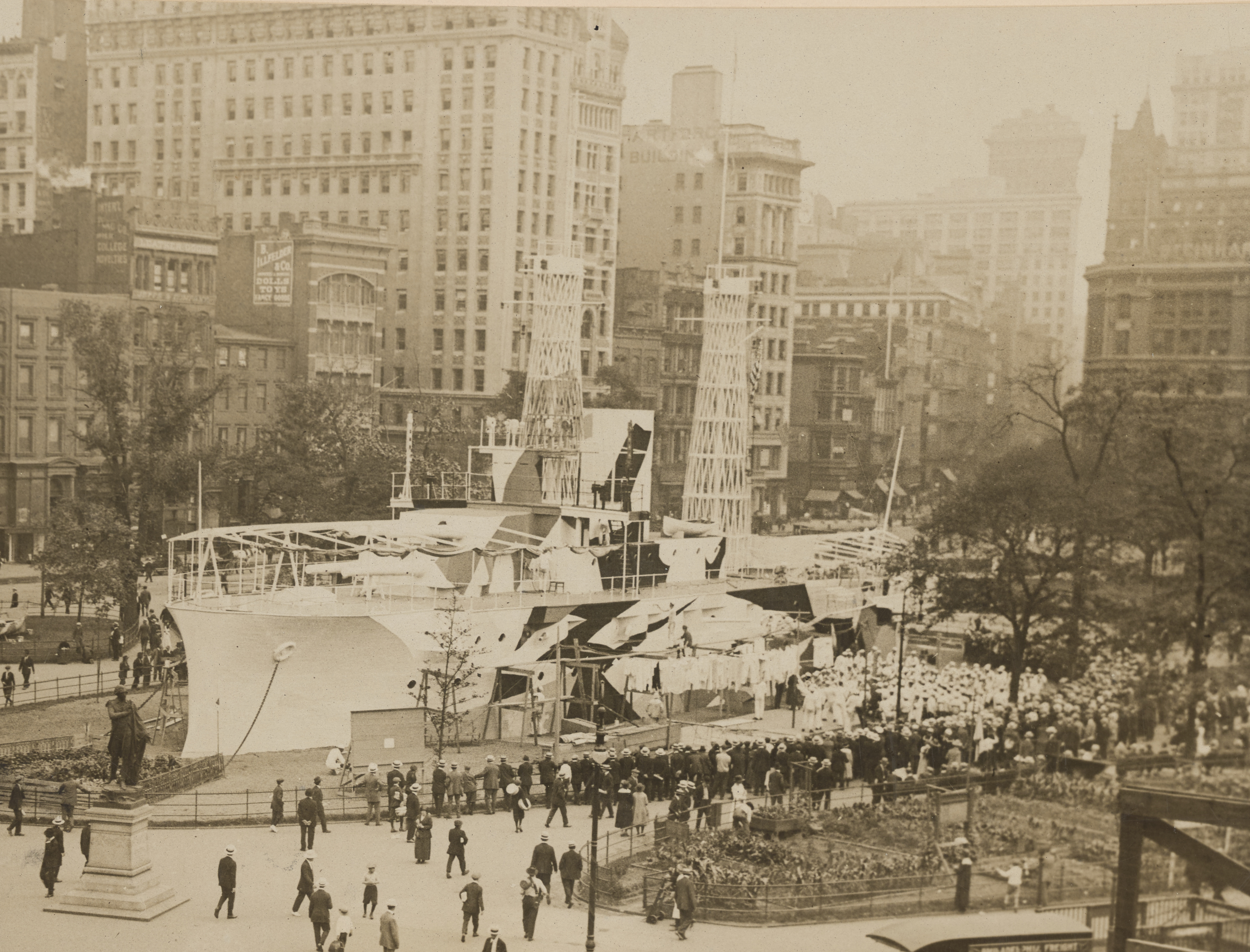

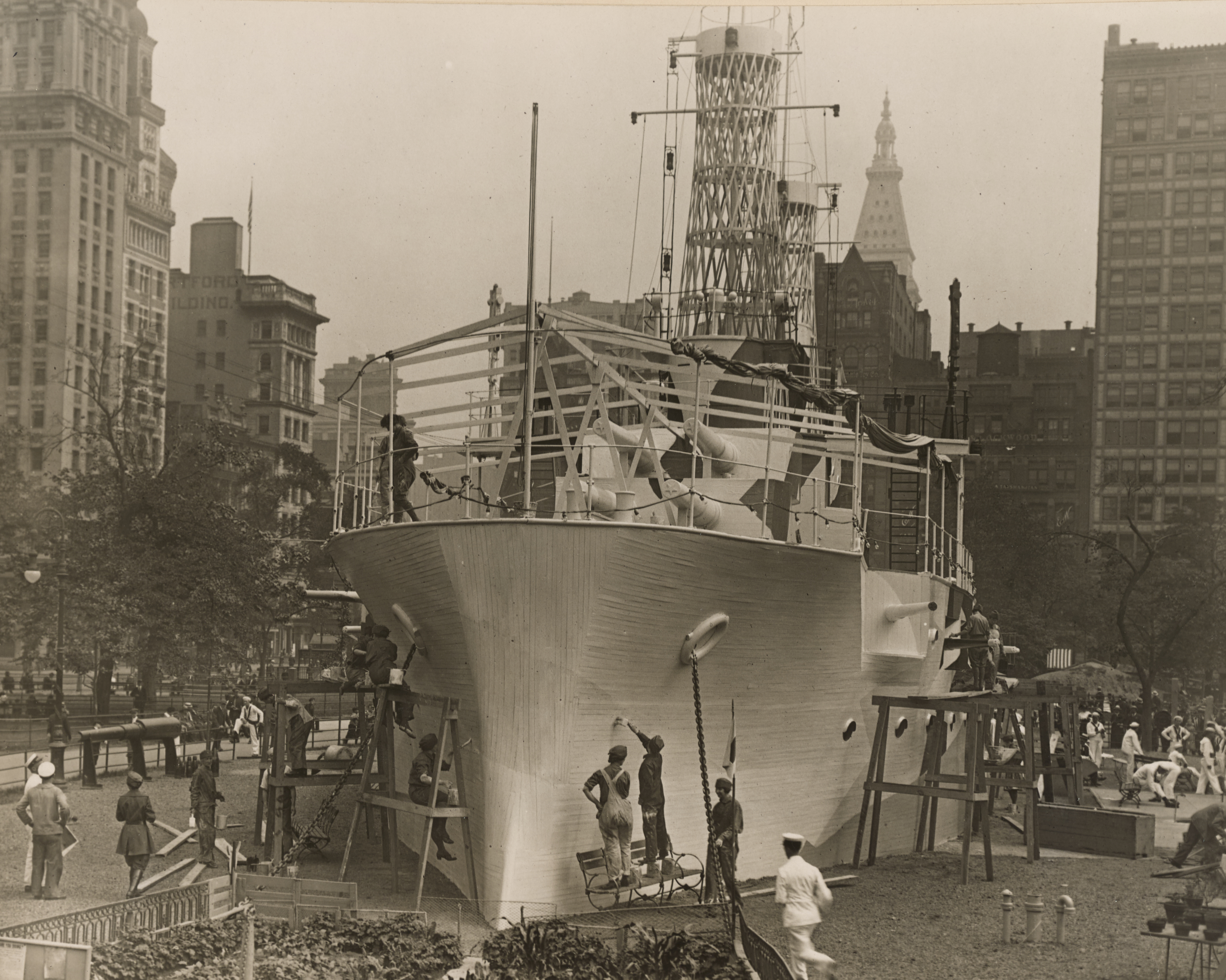

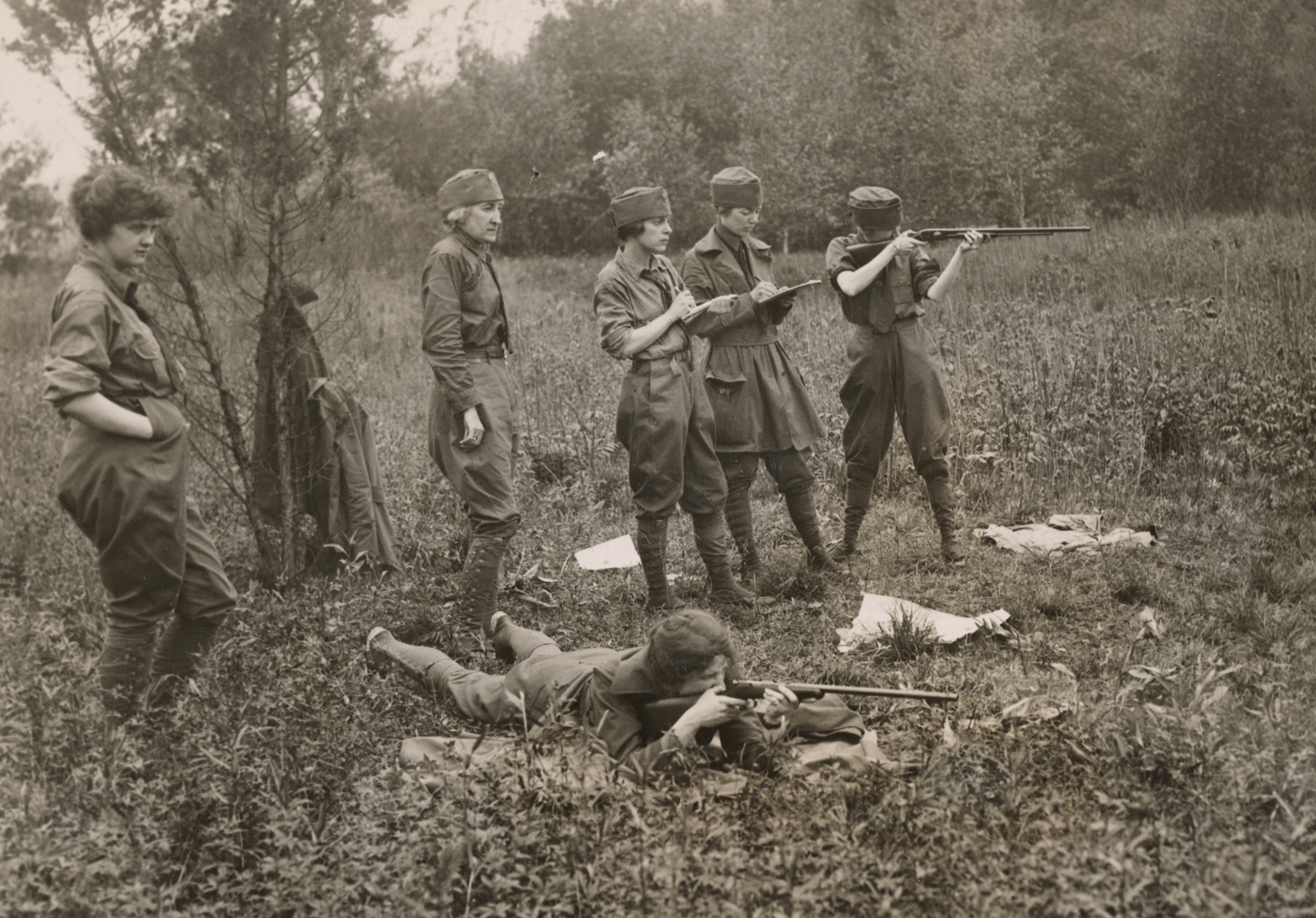

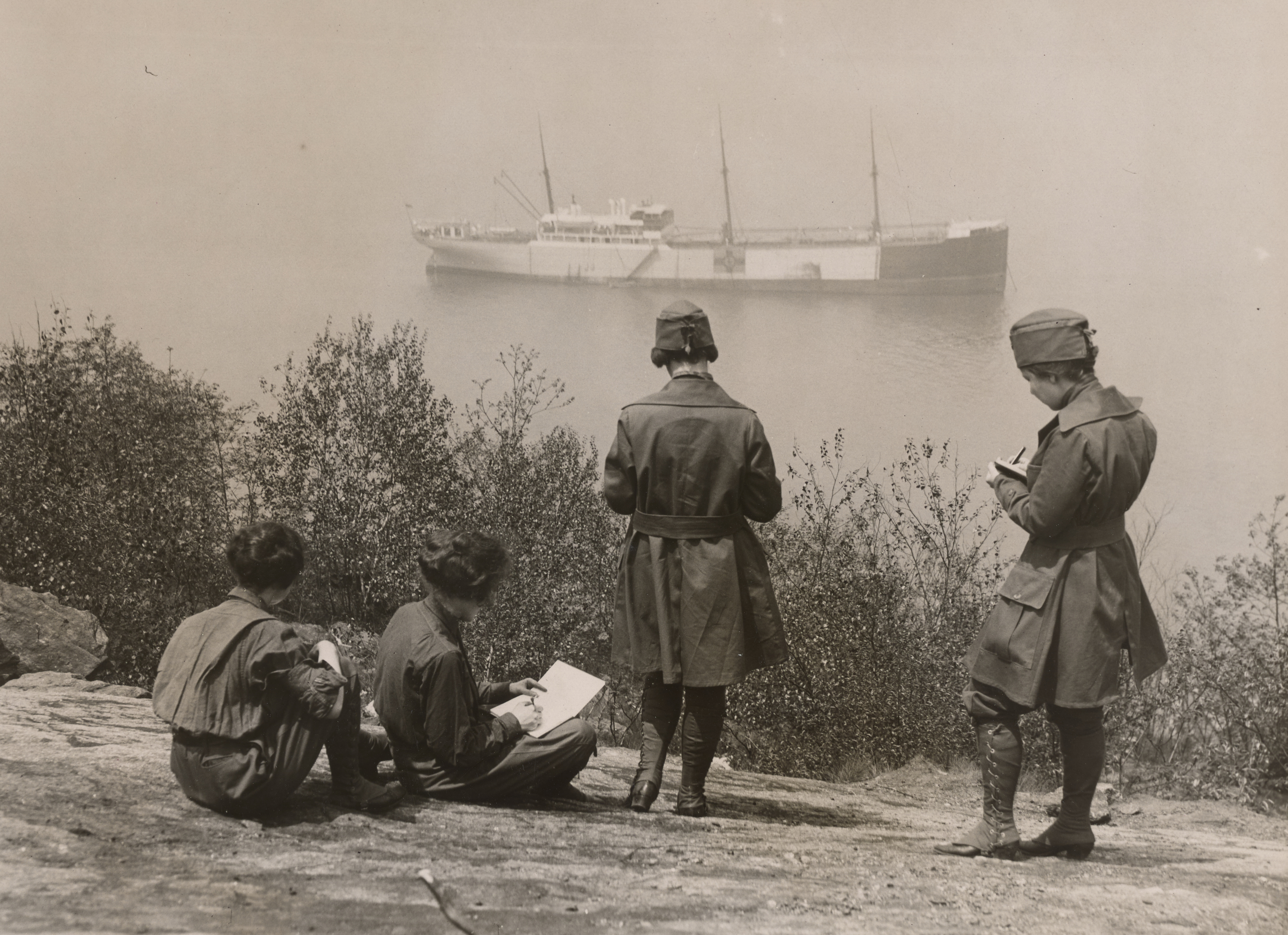

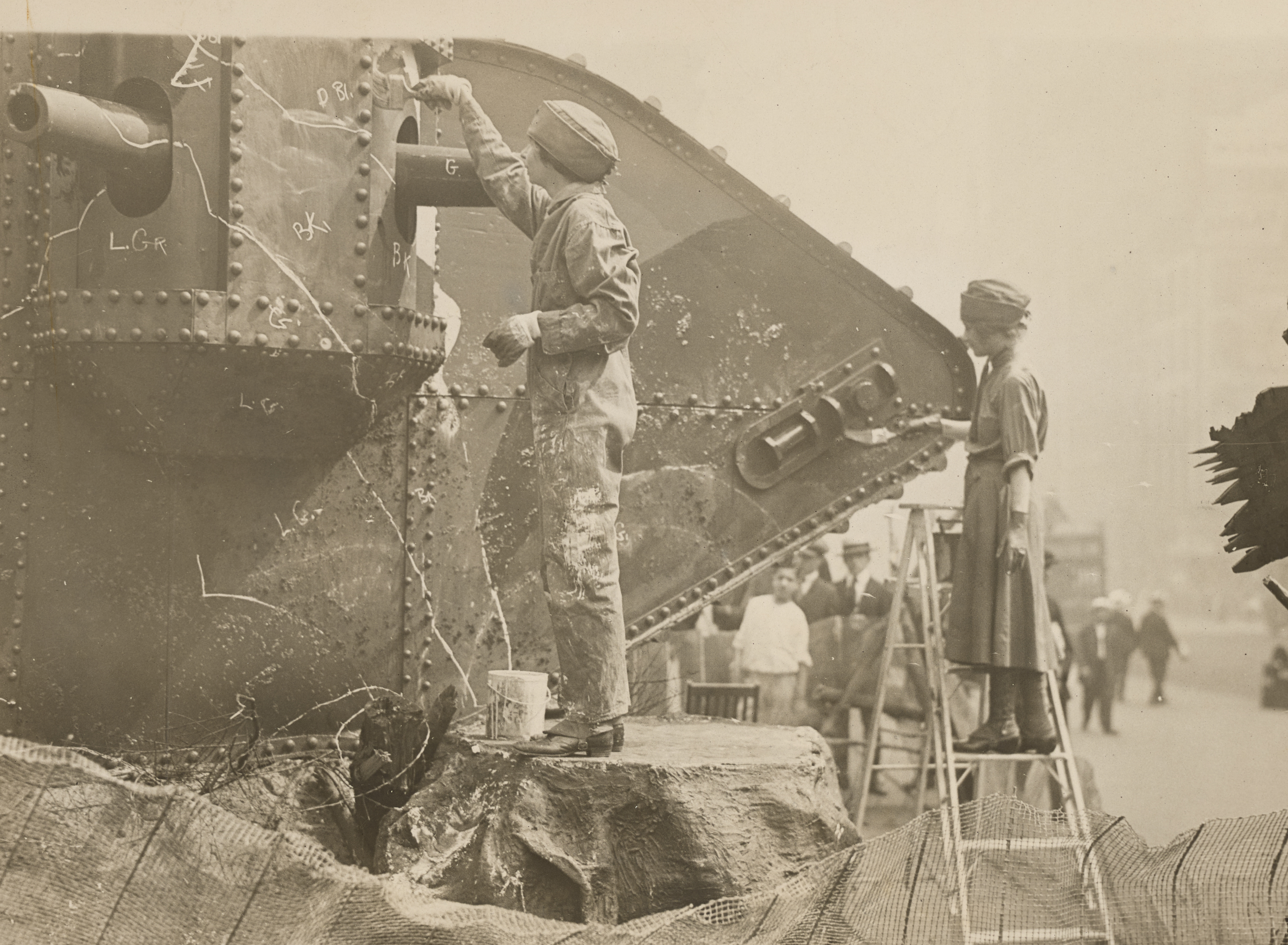

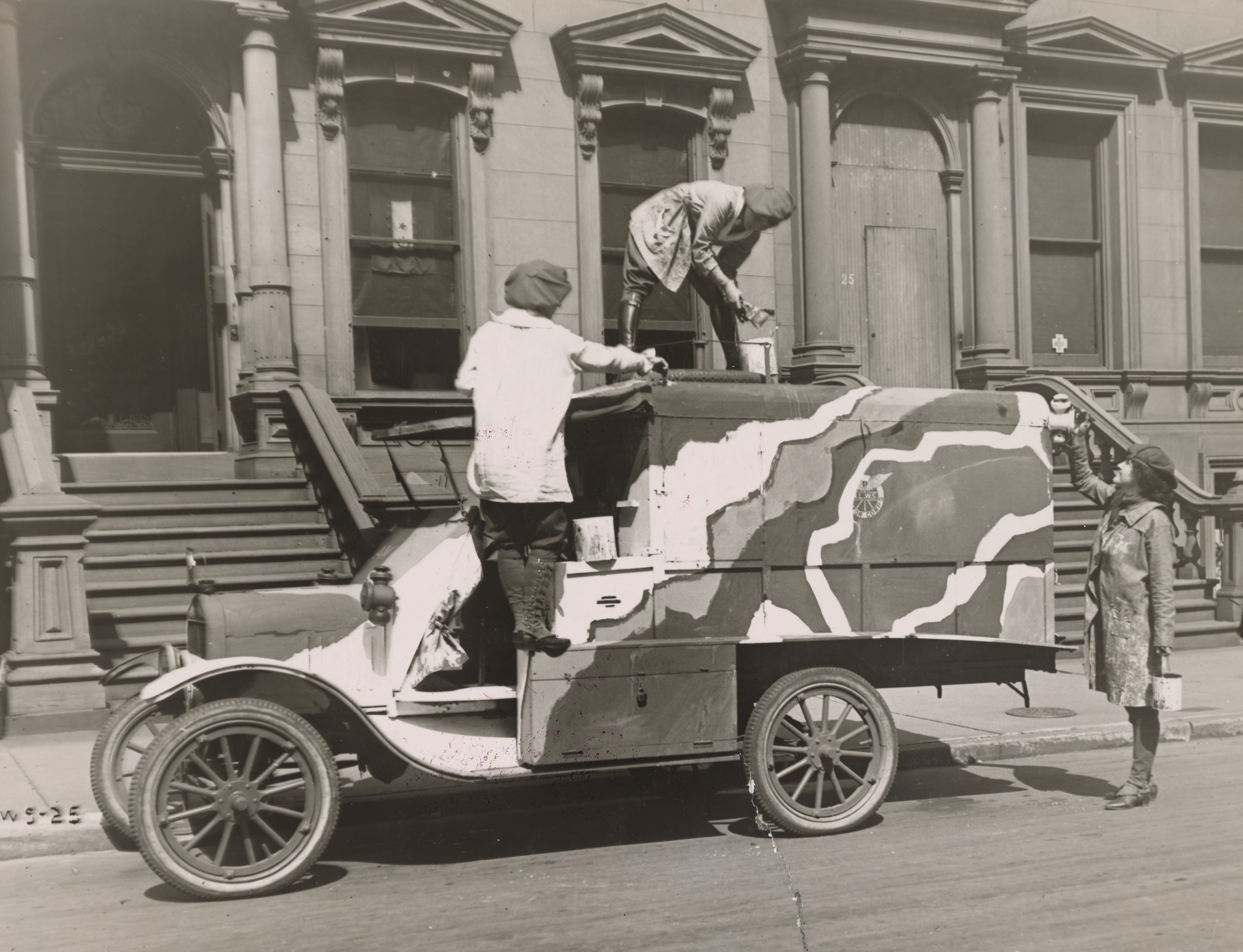

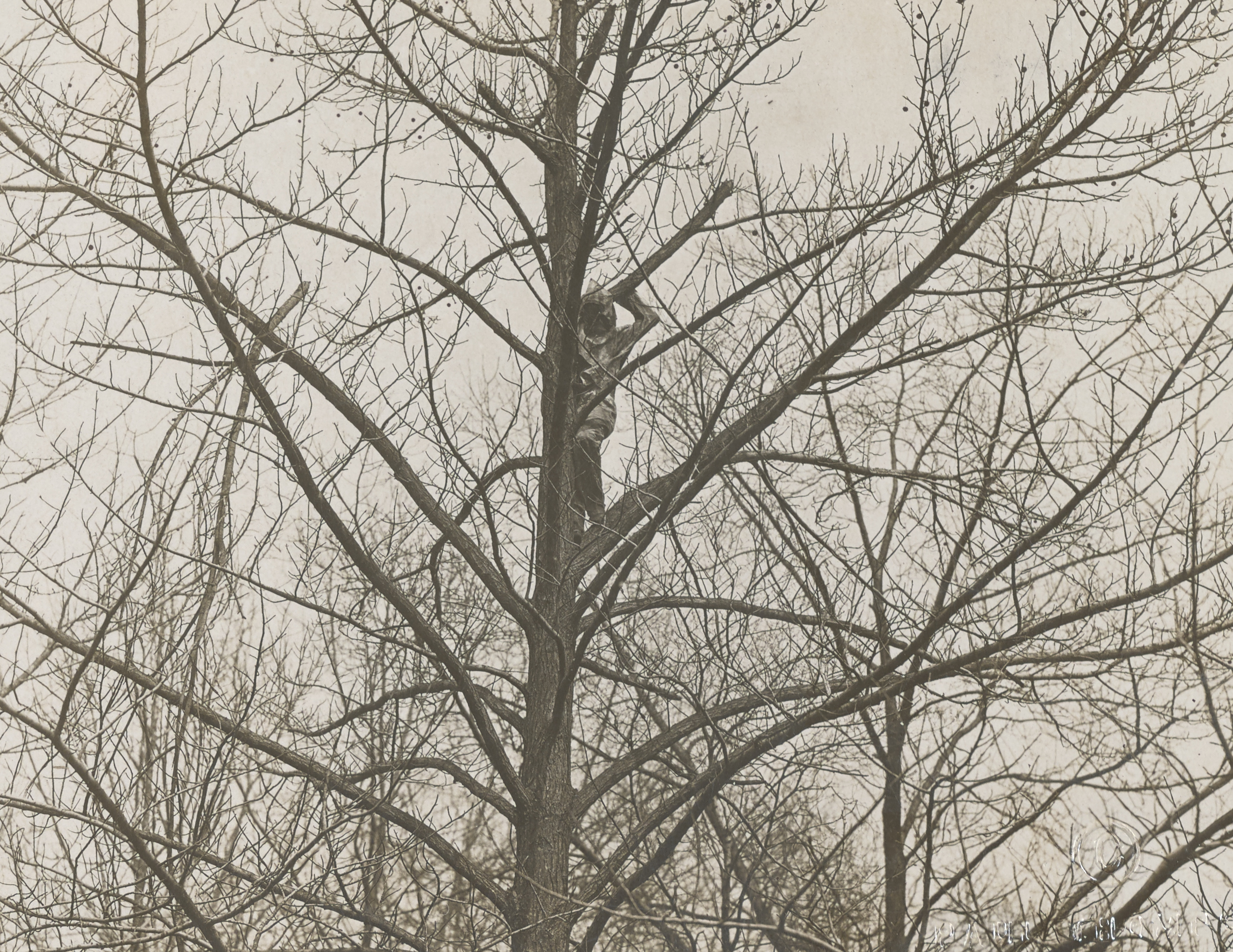

== See also ==
- American Camouflage Corps
- List of camoufleurs
