= Edward Julian Nally =

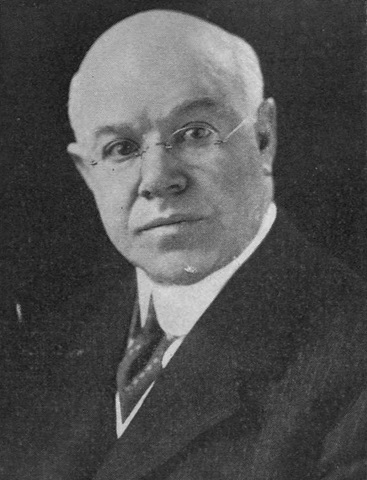
Nally in 1923

Edward Julian Nally (1859–1953) was a U.S. radio industrialist. Nally served as the vice president and general manager of American Marconi Company and was the first president of RCA between 1919 and 1923.

== See also ==
- David Sarnoff
