= Pocket Rockers =

Fisher Price portable audio player

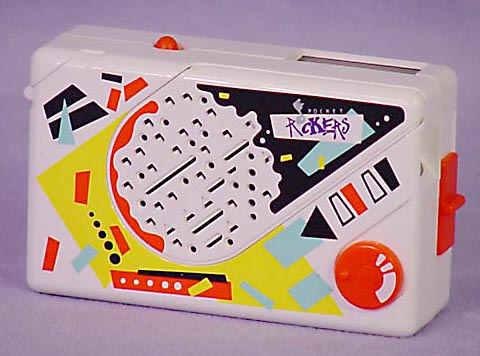
- Type: Portable audio player
- Company: Fisher-Price
- Country: United States
- Availability: 1988–1991

Pocket Rockers was a brand of personal stereo produced by Fisher-Price in the late 1980s, aimed at elementary school-age children. They played a proprietary variety of miniature cassette (appearing to be a smaller version of the 8-track tape) which was released only by Fisher-Price themselves. Designed to be as much of a fashion accessory as a music player, the devices were enough of a youth craze to even be banned in some schools for a brief period.

Housed in a variety of stylish, translucent colors, each tape had two songs in mono which could be clipped to clothing to showcase one's musical taste. Tapes were available from several pop stars, including Michael Jackson, Whitney Houston, Tiffany, or Debbie Gibson and even rock stars like Bon Jovi or The Bangles. The commercials featured an original theme song which was a parody of "Down on the Corner" by Creedence Clearwater Revival.

In addition to standard blue on black and pink on black color schemes, 3 variations of Pocket Rockers were released utilizing Memphis Milano (a popular and contemporary design style at the time). A collectors set was released featuring one such design, and a deluxe system was also released which included speakers and a display stand with an amplifier. Other official Pocket Rockers branded accessories included bracelets, a bandana, a multitude of tape storage options (cases, frames, and clips), mini tape clip-ons, a carrying case, a purse, and headphones.

Following a sharp decline in sales, the Pocket Rockers line was discontinued in 1991 until ultimately being removed from Fisher-Price's toy catalog in 1992. Today, the player and cassettes are sought after by collectors for their unique novelty and design.

== Recording technology ==
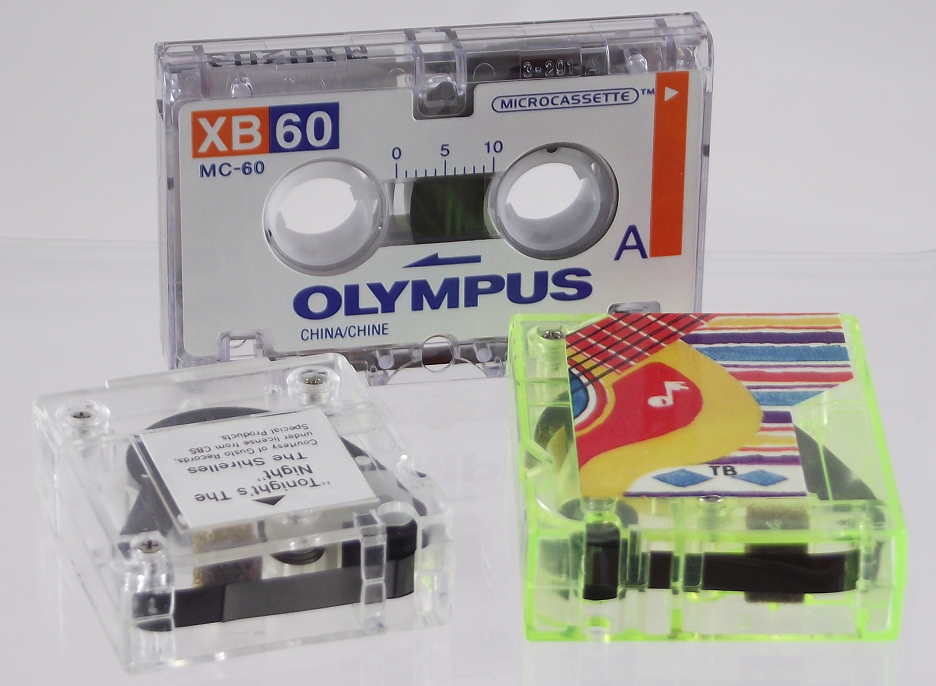
Bandai Micro Cartridge, Pocket Rockers and microcassette

Inside the Pocket Rockers cartridge, the same 3.81 mm (0.150 Inch) tape like in the Compact Cassette is used, running at same tape speed of 1 7/8 Inch per second. The upper two tracks contain one mono recording each, and the player has a switch that lets the listener change between the two available tracks. A small knob on the front controls the volume, and a headphone jack is on the side as well as a slider to eject the tape.

Winding the tape into a Compact Cassette, the recording is playing backwards. The lower two tracks were not used. The tape head is bottom top mounted Compact Cassette player head. The small endless tape cartridge based on a technology invented by Bernard Cousino is operated by a belt-driven capstan. Unlike standard cassettes, the pinch roller is part of the cassette rather than the player.

== List of featured artists and songs ==
† denotes recording not by original artist.

Bananarama
"I Heard a Rumour"

The Bangles†
"Walk Like an Egyptian" / "Manic Monday"

The Beach Boys
"Surfin' Safari" / "Surfin' U.S.A."

Beastie Boys
"(You Gotta) Fight for Your Right (To Party!)"

Chuck Berry
"Johnny B. Goode" / "Rock and Roll Music"

Bon Jovi
"Livin' on a Prayer" / "Runaway"
"Wanted Dead or Alive" / "You Give Love a Bad Name"

Boston
"Amanda" / "Can'tcha Say/Still In Love""

Breakfast Club
"Right on Track" / "Kiss and Tell"

Belinda Carlisle
"Heaven Is a Place on Earth" / "I Get Weak"

The Champs†
"Tequila"

Phil Collins
"Sussudio" / "Don't Lose My Number"

Cutting Crew
"(I Just) Died in Your Arms" / "I've Been in Love Before"

Danny & the Juniors
"At the Hop" / "Rock 'n' Roll Is Here To Stay"

Taylor Dayne
"Prove Your Love" / "Tell It to My Heart"

Exposé
"Let Me Be the One" / "Seasons Change"

The Fat Boys
"Wipe Out" / "Rock Ruling"

Genesis
"The Last Domino" / "Invisible Touch"

Debbie Gibson
"Shake Your Love" / "Only in My Dreams"

Bill Haley & His Comets
"Rock Around the Clock" / "Shake, Rattle and Roll"

Jan Hammer + Glenn Frey
"Miami Vice Theme" / "The Heat Is On"

Whitney Houston
"How Will I Know" / "The Greatest Love of All"
"I Wanna Dance with Somebody (Who Loves Me)" / "So Emotional"

Michael Jackson
"Bad" / "Beat It"
"Wanna Be Startin' Somethin'" / "Another Part of Me"

The Jets
"Cross My Broken Heart" / "You Got It All"
"Make It Real" / "I Do You"

LeVert
"Casanova" / "My Forever Love"

Huey Lewis and the News
"Doing It All for My Baby" / "The Power of Love"
"Hip to Be Square" / "The Heart of Rock & Roll"

Lisa Lisa and Cult Jam†
"Head to Toe" / "Lost in Emotion"

Kenny Loggins†
"Footloose" / "Danger Zone"

Los Lobos†
"La Bamba" / "Tequila"

Madonna†
"Who's That Girl?" / "Material Girl"

Mike + The Mechanics
"All I Need Is a Miracle" / " You Are the One"

Ray Parker Jr. + The Monkees
"Ghostbusters" / "(Theme From) The Monkees"

Tom Petty
"Don't Come Around Here No More" / :"So You Want to Be a Rock 'n' Roll Star"

Pretty Poison
"Catch Me (I'm Falling)" / "Nighttime"

David Lee Roth
"California Girls"

Bruce Springsteen
"Born in the U.S.A."/"Pink Cadillac"

Tears for Fears
"Shout" / "Everybody Wants to Rule the World"

Tiffany
"All This Time" / "Radio Romance"
"I Saw Him Standing There" / "Feelings of Forever"
"I Think We're Alone Now" / "Could've Been"

T'Pau
"Heart and Soul" / "China in Your Hand"

Wham!
"Wake Me Up Before You Go-Go"

Kim Wilde
"You Keep Me Hangin' On" / "Say You Really Want Me"

== See also ==
- HitClips
