= Endless tape cartridge =

Type of magnetic tape cartridge

An endless tape cartridge is a tape cartridge or cassette that contains magnetic audio tape that can be played in an endless loop, without the need to rewind to repeat.

== Description ==
The endless tape cartridge has a tape transport that allows forward movement only. The magnetic tape can have start and end markers, like a magnetic beacon, an electric conductive splice, a hole that can be optically scanned, or a transparent splice tape. The cartridge was invented by sound engineer Bernard A. Cousino and it dominated the North American market for many years.

One of the first products that used the endless tape technology was the Audio Vendor from 1952, an invention of Cousino's. It was registered as patent US2804401A. The tape is passed through an inner ring of loose tape reel, where the recording is stored, and looped back through the outer ring of the reel. Initially, this mechanism was to be implemented in a reel-to-reel audio tape recorder.

Later, Cousino developed a plastic case that could be hung up on some existing tape recorders. This cartridge was marketed by John Herbert Orr as Orrtronic Tapette. In this generation, the magnetic coating of the tape was wound on the inside of the reel. Later cartridge types had the magnetic layer aligned to the outside of the cartridge, which required a specially designed recorder to play it. One traction of the tape by capstan was added, which allowed users the convenience of just pushing the cartridge into the recorder without having to thread the tape. These cassettes needed no internal space for the tape head slider because they accessed the tape from outside the cartridge.

Based on these new cassettes, George Eash developed the Fidelipac cartridge in 1954. PlayTape and the 8-track tape and endless compact cassettes for the announcement text of answering machines were made with this technique. The take-up roll got a table and the perforation for traction was removed. There was no rear winding roll inside such a cassette so rewinding was impossible. Previously, a similar technique was used to store Tefifon's vinyl sonic tape in the Tefi cartridge.

Another invention patented by Cousino was the graphite coating applied to the bottom side of the tape in endless cartridges. The coating allowed endless tape to be pulled out without crinkling it. 8-track cassettes also used the coating which caused the bottom side of the tape to be grey in colour.

== Technological predecessor of the endless cartridge ==
- Magnetic audio tape (1933)
- Tefifon (1936) – the vinyl sonic tape was similarly stored in the Tefi cartridge, but without any reel
- Audio Vendor – an assembly to install on a reel-to-reel tape recorder device by Bernard Cousino
- Stereo tape (1953) – first stereo audio storage for end users

== List of endless tape cartridges ==
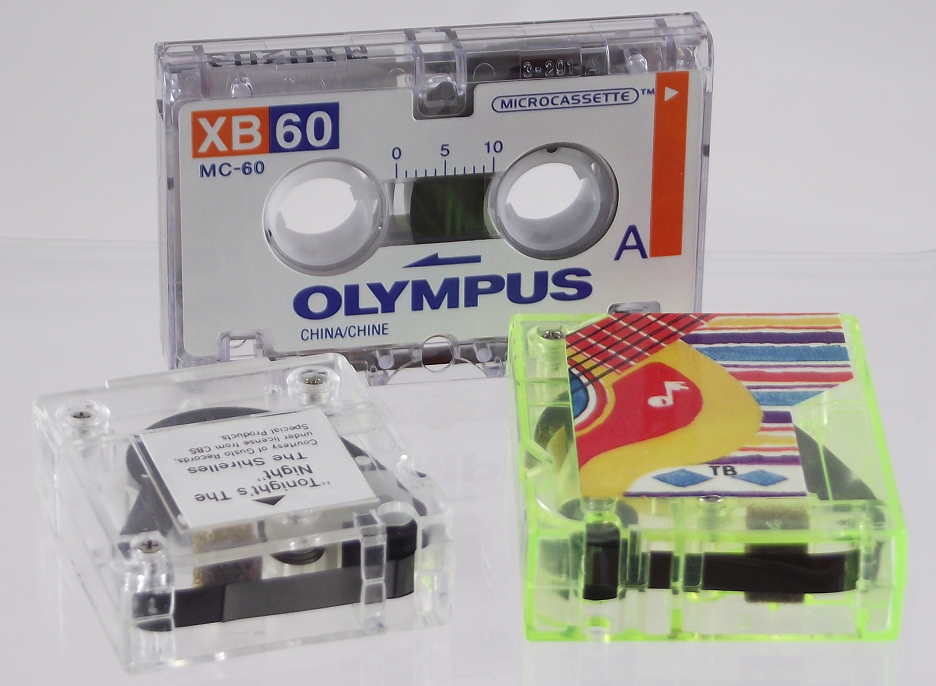
Bandai Micro Cartridge, Pocket Rockers and microcassette

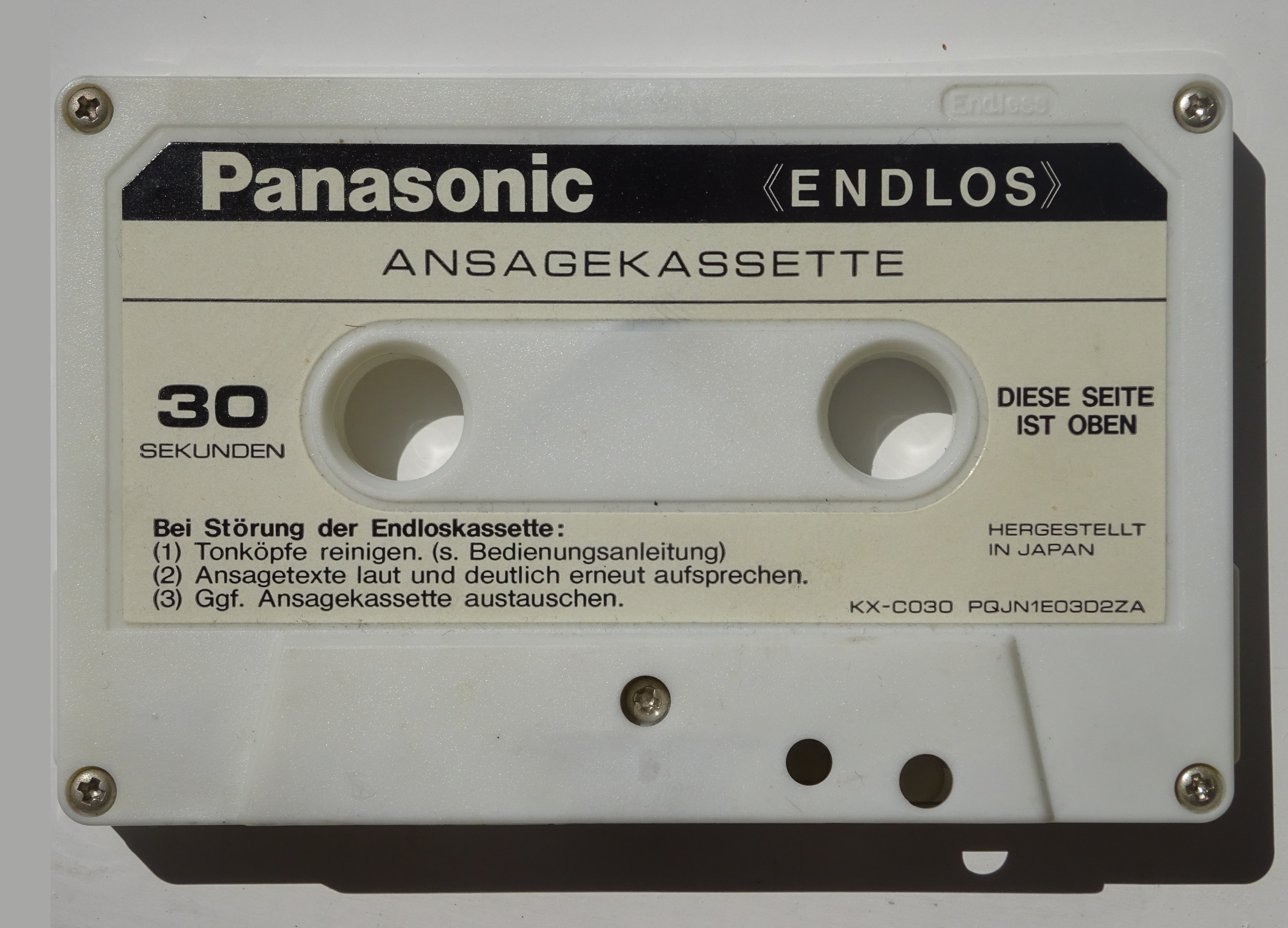
Endless compact cassette from Panasonic (30 seconds)

The different data cartridges and sound cartridges in chronological market launch order:

- 1950s: Orrtronic Tapette
- 1959: 3-track tape / Fidelipac / NAB-CARTridge "NAB-CART" / Rowe Customusic used the large C-type Fidelipac
- 1960: Rediffusion Reditune
- 1962: 4-track tape, also called Muntz Stereo-Pak or "CARtridge"
- 1960s: Mohawk Message Repeater Cartridge
- 1966: 8-track tape, also called Stereo-8 or 8-Track
- 1966: PlayTape
- 1967: SCM Mail Call, reused the Playtape cartridge
- 1969: endless compact cassette – for the announcement in answering machines
- 1971: HiPac,
- 1975: Ponkey, reused the HiPac cartridge
- 1983: ZX Microdrive Data Cartridge and tape drive – for data storage and backup
- ~1985: Bandai Micro Cartridge
- ~1987: Pocket Rockers
