= Timeline of audio formats =

Evolution of auditory media

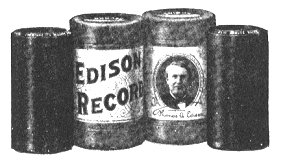
Edison Cylinder Records with packages, from 1910 catalogue

An audio format is a medium for sound recording and reproduction. The term is applied to both the physical recording media and the recording formats of the audio content—in computer science it is often limited to the audio file format, but its wider use usually refers to the physical method used to store the data. Note on the use of analog compared to digital in this list; the definition of digital used here for early formats is that which is represented using discrete values rather than fluctuating variables. A piano roll is digital as it has discrete values, that being a hole for each key, unlike a phonograph record which is analog with a fluctuating groove.

Music is recorded and distributed using a variety of audio formats, some of which store additional information.

== Timeline of audio format developments ==
Year	Physical media formats	Recording formats
1805	Panharmonicon	Digital, automated sound reproducing machine.
1810s	Organ Cob	Mechanical digital, also known as a barrel organ. Nails in wooden cylinder actuate mechanical parts of organ.
1817	Apollonicon	Digital, automated sound reproducing machine.
1851	Piano Cylinder	Digital, automatically played by means of revolving cylinders
1877	Tinfoil Phonograph	In 1877, Thomas Edison invented the first recorder that could also play back Analog; sound waveform transcribed to tinfoil
1883	Piano roll	A piano roll used in a player piano Digital (vacuum-operated piano)
1886	Music Box disc	8'' disc for playback on a music box Digital (vacuum-operated music box)
Late 1880s	Brown Wax cylinder	A collection of brown wax cylinders, vertical-groove Analog; vertical groove, vertical stylus motion – could be re-recorded
Late 1880s	Ediphone, Dictaphone	A Dictaphone cylinder for voice recording Analog, the Ediphone and subsequent wax cylinders used in Edison's other product lines continued to be sold up until 1929 when the Edison Manufacturing Company folded.
1894	Pathé cylinder	The vertical-groove pathé cylinder Mechanical analog; vertical grooves, vertical stylus motion
1897	78rpm Record (Emile Berliner Patent)	78rpm record - playable on modern turntables Mechanical analog; lateral groove, horizontal stylus motion – early examples made from hard rubber, most made from shellac.
1898	Wire recording	A Peirce 55-B dictation wire recorder from 1945 Analog; magnetization; DC bias
1902	Edison Gold Moulded Record	Edison's "gold moulded" black wax cylinder record Mechanical analog; vertical groove, horizontal stylus motion – made from hard black wax – 160 rpm standard – 100 threads per inch
1903	Phonograph Postcard	A phonograph post card, playable on 78rpm turntables Mechanical analog; lateral groove, horizontal stylus motion
1905	Centre-start phonograph Record	A modern vinyl LP with a centre-start cut Mechanical analog; lateral groove, horizontal stylus motion, starts from the centre of the disc
1905	Pathé disc	The vertical-groove pathé disc Mechanical analog; vertical groove, vertical stylus motion. Alternative to 78s manufactured by Pathé Records, Brunswick Records and Grey Gull Records.
1908	2-minute or Amberol Cylinder Record	The Edison "Amberol" cylinder record, vertical groove Mechanical analog; vertical groove, vertical stylus motion – made from hard black wax – 160 rpm standard – 200 threads per inch. Best known are the later 12-inch Amberols, which came out in 1912.
1912	Diamond Disc	The Edison vertical-groove "diamond disc" Mechanical analog; vertical groove, vertical stylus motion – made from Bakelite or china clay
1924	Electrical cut 78	Mechanical analog; electrically cut from amplified microphone signal, lateral groove, horizontal stylus motion, most at now standardized 78 rpm A record player for electrical cut 78s can play acoustic 78s, but one should not play electrical cut 78s on a record player meant for acoustic 78s.
1930	Filmophone flexible record	A red Filmophone record Mechanical analog; lateral groove, horizontal stylus movement – made from cellulose of various colours – 78 rpm
1930	Durium Record or Hit of the Week Records	A brown Durium 78 rpm record Mechanical analog; lateral groove – made from paper coated in a brown resin (Durium)
1930s	Reel-to-reel, magnetic tape	Studio master tape reel Analog; magnetization; AC "bias" dramatically increases linearity/fidelity, tape speed at 30 ips, later 15 ips and other refined speeds: 7 1/2 ips, 3 3/4 ips, 1 7/8 ips
1930s	Electrical transcriptions	Mechanical analog; electrically cut from amplified microphone signal, high fidelity sound, lateral or vertical groove, horizontal or vertical stylus motion, most discs 16" at 33 1/3 rpm
1942	SoundScriber	Green, vertical groove Sound Scriber disks Mechanical analog; vertical groove, 4–6 inch discs, it recorded sound by pressing grooves into soft vinyl discs
1947	Dictabelt (Memobelt)	Red dictabelt. Analog, medium consisting of a thin, plastic belt 3.5" wide that was placed on a cylinder and rotated like a tank tread, developed by the Dictaphone company in 1947
1948	33.3 RPM LP record (Columbia)	An early 10 inch LP Analog, with preemphasis and other equalization techniques (LP, RIAA); lateral groove, horizontal stylus motion; discs 7", 10" and 12" at 33 1/3 rpm, 1st LP Columbia ML 4001 Milstein, Mendelssohn Violin Concerto
1949	Vinyl 45 record (RCA)	A 7'' 45rpm record Analog 45 rpm vinyl 7" disk, first 45 pressed "PeeWee the Piccolo" RCA 47-0147 Indianapolis
1950	Tefifon	A stand-alone Tefifon player with cartridge loaded Electro–mechanical analog, vinyl belt housed in a cassette, used an embossing technique using a stylus to imprint the information, was the first thing to resemble a modern audio cassette
1950	16 2/3rpm vinyl record	A label close-up on a 16 rpm vinyl Mechanical analog; lateral groove, horizontal stylus motion – played at half the regular speed of an LP
1951	Minifon P55	Minifon cassette Analog, magnetic wire on reel, 30 cm/s or about 11.8 ips was quickly adopted by many governments as being the ultimate "spy" recorder of its day
1957	Stereophonic vinyl record	An early stereo record label Analog, with pre-emphasis and other equalization techniques. Combination lateral/vertical stylus motion with each channel encoded 45 degrees to the vertical
1957	Dictet	Cassette for the Dictaphone Dictet dictation machine Analog, 1/4 tape, 2.48 in/s, (3-inch reels housed 5.875 × 3 × .4375 inch cassette), developed by the Dictaphone Corp
1958	RCA tape cartridge (Sound Tape) (Magazine Loading Cartridge)	The cassette format created by RCA Analog, 1/4 inch wide tape (stereo & mono), 3 3/4 in/s & 1.875 in/s, one of the first attempts to offer reel-to-reel tape recording quality in a convenient format for the consumer market
1959	NAB Cart Tape (Fidelipac)	The cartridge known as a "Fidelipac" Analog, 1/4 inch wide tape in cartridge, 7 1/2 in/s & 15 in/s, Introduced in 1959 by Collins Radio, the cart tape format was designed for use by radio broadcasters to play commercials, bumpers and announcements
1959	Synchrofax Sound Paper	Magnetic coating on paper.
1961	Orrtronic Tapette.	Analog, endless tape cartridge.
1962	4-Track (Muntz Stereo-Pak)	4 track player with cartridge Analog, 1/4-inch-wide (6.4 mm) tape, 3 3/4 in/s, endless-loop cartridge
1963	Compact cassette	Variants of the Compact Cassette Analog, with bias. 0.15 inches (3.81 mm) tape, 1 7/8 ips. 1970: introduced Dolby noise reduction
1964	Sanyo Micro Pack 35; Channel Master 6546; Westinghouse H29R1	The micro pack recording system, intended for dictation 1/4 inch wide tape housed in a transparent cartridge measuring 2.6 × 2.9 × 1.9 inches, tape was stored on two reels residing atop one another, keeping the cartridge compact
1964	Sabamobil	Sabamobil tape cartridge A cartridge format for embedding and easy handling usual 3-inch-tape-reels with 1/4 inch tape, compatible to reel-to-reel audio recording in 3 3/4 ips.
1965	8-Track (Stereo-8)	The inside of an 8-track cartridge Analog, 1/4 inch wide tape, 3 3/4 in/s, endless-loop cartridge
1965	DC-International cassette system	DC-International cassette Analog cassette format introduced by Grundig, Telefunken and Blaupunkt: 120 × 77 × 12 mm cassette with 1/4 inch wide tape run at 5.08 cm per second.
1966	PlayTape	Two PlayTape cartridges Analog, 1/8 inch wide tape, endless-loop cartridge, introduced by Frank Stanton
1969	Microcassette	A comparison of sizes for the Microcassette and Minicassette Analog, 1/8 inch wide tape, used generally for note taking, mostly mono, some stereo (developed in the early '80s). 2.4 cm/s or 1.2 cm/s
1969	Minicassette	A Minicassette on top of a Compact Cassette. Analog, 1/8 inch wide tape, used generally for note taking, 1.2 ^{cm}/_{s}
1970	Quadraphonic 8-Track (Quad-8) (Q8)	A Quadraphonic 8-Track Cartridge Analog, 1/4 inch wide tape, 3 3/4 in/s, 4-channel stereo, endless-loop cartridge
1971	Quadraphonic Vinyl Record (CD-4) (SQ Matrix)	An SQ quadraphonic record Analog, introduced by CBS Records for matrix and RCA / JVC for CD-4 Recorded two tracks on both stereo channels, requiring a decoder to hear all four tracks. Despite this, the format is playable on any LP turntable.
1971	HiPac	Analog, a successor of the 1966 PlayTape, using tape width of the 1963 Compact Cassette, Japan only
1976	Dolby Stereo cinema surround sound	Analog
1976	Elcaset	Elcaset (left) compared to a typical compact cassette (right) Analog, name comes from "L-Cassette/Large Cassette"
1982	Compact Disc (CD-DA)	A CD. Digital. Linear PCM (LPCM)
1986	High Definition Compatible Digital (HDCD)	An HDCD album Digital. Redbook compatible physical CD containing 20–24 bit information (uses linear pulse-code modulation (LPCM))
1987	Digital Audio Tape (DAT)	A DAT tape Digital. This audio format famously caused controversy among recording companies when released due to the potential of perfect digital copies to increase piracy
1988	AIFF (file format)	Digital. Audio Interchange File Format (AIFF)
1992	Digital Compact Cassette (DCC)	A Digital Compact Cassette Digital, 1/8 inch wide tape, 1 7/8 in/s, introduced by Philips and Matsushita in late 1992, marketed as the successor to the standard analog compact cassette
1992	WAV (file format)	Digital. Named after the waveform created by a sound wave.
1992	Dolby Digital Cinema Sound	Digital. Also known as Dolby Stereo Digital until 1994.
1992	MiniDisc (MD)	A red, translucent MiniDisc cartridge Digital. Adaptive Transform Acoustic Coding (ATRAC)
1993	DTS, SDDS, MP3 (file formats)	A photo of a theatrical DTS CD-ROM disc used for the original 1993 release of Jurassic Park Digital. Digital Theatre System (DTS), Sony Dynamic Digital Sound (SDDS), MPEG-1 Audio Layer III (MP3)
1994	TwinVQ	Digital.
1995	RealAudio	
1997	DTS-CD	Digital. DTS audio
1998	WavPack (file format)	Digital. PCM, lossless compression (2002 hybrid compression) (2016 DSD support)
1999	DVD-Audio	Digital. Including Meridian Lossless Packing (MLP), Linear PCM (LPCM), Dolby Digital (AC-3) and Digital Theatre System (DTS)
1999	Super Audio CD (SACD)	Digital. Direct Stream Digital
1999	WMA (file format)	Digital. Windows Media Audio
1999	TTA (file format)	Digital. The True Audio Lossless Codec.
2000	FLAC (file format)	Digital. Free Lossless Audio Codec (open, non-proprietary, patent-and-royalty-free)
2000	Ogg Vorbis (file format)	Digital. Vorbis compressed audio format (open, non-proprietary, patent-and-royalty-free)
2000	DSDIFF (file format)	Digital. DSD, optional DST compression
2000	APE (file format)	Digital. Monkey's Audio
2001	AAC (file format)	Digital. Advanced Audio Coding
2002	WSD (file format)	Digital. DSD
2004	ALE or ALAC (file formats)	Digital. Apple Lossless
2005	DSF (file format)	Digital. DSD
2008	slotMusic	A SlotMusic microSD card: an early attempt to sell pre-recorded music on an SD card Digital. Usually at 320 kbit/s MP3 on microSD or microSDHC.
2008	Blu-spec CD	Digital. PCM
2012	Opus (file format)	Digital. Opus lossy audio coding format (IETF standard, open, non-proprietary, royalty-free)
2016	Blu-Ray HFPA	Digital. Audio-only version of Blu-Ray.

== See also ==
- Timeline of video formats
- Format war
- Audio data compression
