= Frank Stanton =

Frank Stanton may refer to:

- Frank Stanton (executive) (1908–2006), president of CBS, 1946–1973
- Frank Stanton (entrepreneur) (1921–1999), entrepreneur and real-estate investor who was a pioneer in audio and video cassette systems
- Frank Stanton (rugby league) (born 1940), Australian rugby league player and coach
- Frank Lebby Stanton (1857–1927), songwriter and first poet laureate of Georgia
