= Container format (disambiguation) =

A container format is a class of computer file formats that allow embedding multiple distinguishable data streams within a single file. Container format may also refer to:

- Recording format, for holding analog or digitally recorded data on a recording medium
- Carrier signal format, for holding data during active wireless transmission
- Multiplexing format, for combining data for active transmission

== See also ==
- Intermodal container
