= HiPac =

Magnetic tape sound recording technology

- Media type: Magnetic tape cartridge endless loop
- Encoding: Stereo analog signal
- Capacity: 2 × 30 min @ 1 7/8 IPS
- Read mechanism: stereo tape head
- Write mechanism: prerecorded only
- Developed by: Pioneer, HIPAC Council
- Dimensions: 70 × 85 × 12 mm
- Weight: ~ 50 g
- Usage: portable and mobile audio playback devices
- Extended from: PlayTape
- Released: August 1971; 53 years ago
- Discontinued: Mid-1970s

HiPac (stylized as HIPAC) (pronounced as high-pack), is an audio tape cartridge format, introduced in August 1971 on the Japanese consumer market by Pioneer and discontinued in 1973 due to lack of demand. In 1972 it only achieved a market share of 3% in equipping new cars. In the mid 1970s, the format was repurposed as a children's educational toy called ポンキー (Ponkey) and was used in the analog tape delay "Melos Echo Chamber".

== Cartridge ==
HiPac is a successor of the PlayTape cartridge, which had been licensed by Tokyo Shibaura Electric around 1970, and had similar dimensions of 70 mm × 85 mm × 12 mm (2.76 in × 3.35 in × 0.47 in), which is closer to Compact Cassette than other cartridges containing an endless loop tape. Depending on tape length, the weight of each cartridge is about 50 g (1.8 oz) and used the wider four-track magnetic tape of the compact cassette with 3.81 mm (0.150 in) The four audio tracks are separated into two stereo programs. The second program is recorded in the same direction as the first, unlike the Compact Cassette.

There are two specified tape speeds: 60 minutes at 1 7/8 ips or ~4.8 cm/s, and 30 minutes at 3 3/4 ips or ~9.5 cm/s. The tape speed is detected automatically by a notch in the cartridge's case. The slower of these tape speeds is identical to the Compact Cassette.

== HiPac Council ==
In addition to Pioneer, the following companies participated.

- Apollon Music Industry (Apron Ongaku Kōgyō, from 2010 Bandai Music Entertainment)
- Clarion
- Kodansha
- Sharp Corporation
- Tokyo Shibaura Electric (Toshiba)
- Toshiba Music Industry (EMI Music Japan)
- Nippon Columbia
- Hitachi, Ltd.
- Mitsui Bussan Home Appliance Sales

== See also ==
- PlayTape
- 8-track cartridge
- Stereo-Pak
- Album era
- Timeline of audio formats
- Sound recording and reproduction
- Birotron
