= Timeline of video formats =

A video format is a medium for video recording and reproduction. The term is applied to both the physical recording media and the recording formats. Video is recorded and distributed using a variety of formats, some of which store additional information.

== Timeline of video format developments ==
Year	Physical media formats	Recording formats
1889	Film	A film strip An analogue medium that is used for recording motion pictures or animation. It is recorded on by a movie camera, developed, edited, and projected onto a screen using a movie projector. It is a strip or sheet of transparent plastic film base coated on one side with a gelatin emulsion containing microscopically small light-sensitive silver halide crystals.
1956	Quadruplex videotape	A reel of 2-inch quadruplex videotape The first practical and commercially successful analogue recording video tape format, developed and released for the broadcast television industry by Ampex.
1971	U-matic	A U-matic tape Analogue video format developed by Sony, among the first video formats to contain the videotape inside a cassette. Mainly saw use in the television broadcast industry.
1975	Betamax	A Betamax tape Analogue video format developed by Sony. Inspired the later Betacam professional format.
1976	Type B videotape	Type B videotape, one hour reel Reel-to-reel analogue recording video tape format developed by the Bosch Fernseh division of Bosch in Germany. It became the broadcasting standard in continental Europe, but adoption was limited in the United States and United Kingdom, where the Type C videotape format met with greater success.
1976	Type C videotape	Sony BVH-2000 1-inch VTR Professional reel-to-reel analogue recording helical scan videotape format co-developed and introduced by Ampex and Sony in 1976. Displaced the 2-inch quadruplex videotape in the broadcasting industry.
1976	VHS	Video Home System Analogue video recording on tape cassettes. Beat Betamax to become the dominant format for home analogue video.
1978	LaserDisc	Close-up of grooves on a LaserDisc Analogue video that was read via laser stored on a 12 inch disc.
1981	Capacitance Electronic Disc (CED)	Exposed CED disc The Capacitance Electronic Disc (CED) is an analogue video disc playback system developed by RCA, in which video and audio could be played back on a TV set using a special needle and high-density groove system similar to phonograph records.
1984	8mm	A Video8 videocassette. Three related video cassette formats: the original Video8, Hi8, its improved variant, and Digital8. With much smaller tapes than VHS and Betamax, this format became very popular in the consumer camcorder market.
1987	Super VHS	An S-VHS tape. An improved version of the VHS standard for consumer-level video recording. S-VHS improves luminance (luma) resolution by increasing luminance bandwidth. Increased bandwidth is possible because of the increased luminance carrier from 3.4 megahertz (MHz) to 5.4 MHz. The luminance modulator bandwidth also is increased: in contrast to standard VHS's frequencies of 3.8 MHz (sync tip) to 4.8 MHz (peak white), S-VHS uses 5.4 MHz sync tip and 7.0 MHz peak white.
1995	DV	DV cassettes: DVCAM-L, DVCPRO-M, MiniDV. DV, from Digital Video, is a family of codecs and tape formats used for storing digital video, launched in 1995 by a consortium of video camera manufacturers led by Sony and Panasonic.
1997	DVD-Video	A stack of DVD RW disks Digital. MPEG-2 video format and Dolby Digital or Digital Theatre System (DTS) audio format stored on a DVD.
1999	VideoMD	World's first VideoMD Camcorder, Sony DCM-M1. Digital format which stored video on MiniDisc. Saw limited use.
2001	MicroMV	MicroMV videocassette Proprietary videotape format introduced in October 2001 by Sony. It is the smallest videotape format.
2003	DualDisc	One side DVD, one side CD - It's the DualDisc Digital. Multiple formats encoded onto the same disc.
2005	HD DVD	An HD DVD Digital. Uses VC-1, H.264/MPEG-4 AVC, or H.262/MPEG-2 Part 2 video formats and Dolby TrueHD, DTS-HD Master Audio audio formats.
2006	Blu-ray Disc	Blu-Ray discs and their containers Digital. Dolby TrueHD, DTS-HD Master Audio.
2008	slotMusic	A SlotMusic microSD card: an early attempt to sell pre-recorded music on an SD card Digital. Primarily used for MP3, however may also include high-quality images and videos. Stored on microSD or microSDHC.
2008	Blu-spec CD	Digital. PCM
2016	Ultra HD Blu-ray	Back of a triple layer Ultra HD Blu-Ray Disc Digital H.265/MPEG-H Part 2 (HEVC). Dolby TrueHD, DTS-HD Master Audio.

== See also ==
- Timeline of audio formats
- Format war
