= Four track =

Four track may refer to:

- 4-track tape
- Quadruple track railroad
- Stereo-Pak
