= 4-track =

4-track or 4-track tape may refer to:

- The 4-track cartridge as an analogue music storage format popular from the late 1950s
- A 4-track tape for multitrack recording used in professional recording studios
- 8-track tape, which has 4 stereo tracks and so was sometimes colloquially called "4-track tape"
- A quadruple track railway line
