= Tefifon =

German audio playback format

- Media type: Audio
- Encoding: Grooves embossed on plastic tape
- Capacity: 15 minutes, 1 hour, 4 hours
- Developed by: Tefi
- Dimensions: Varied
- Usage: Home audio, educational
- Released: 1940s
- Discontinued: 1965

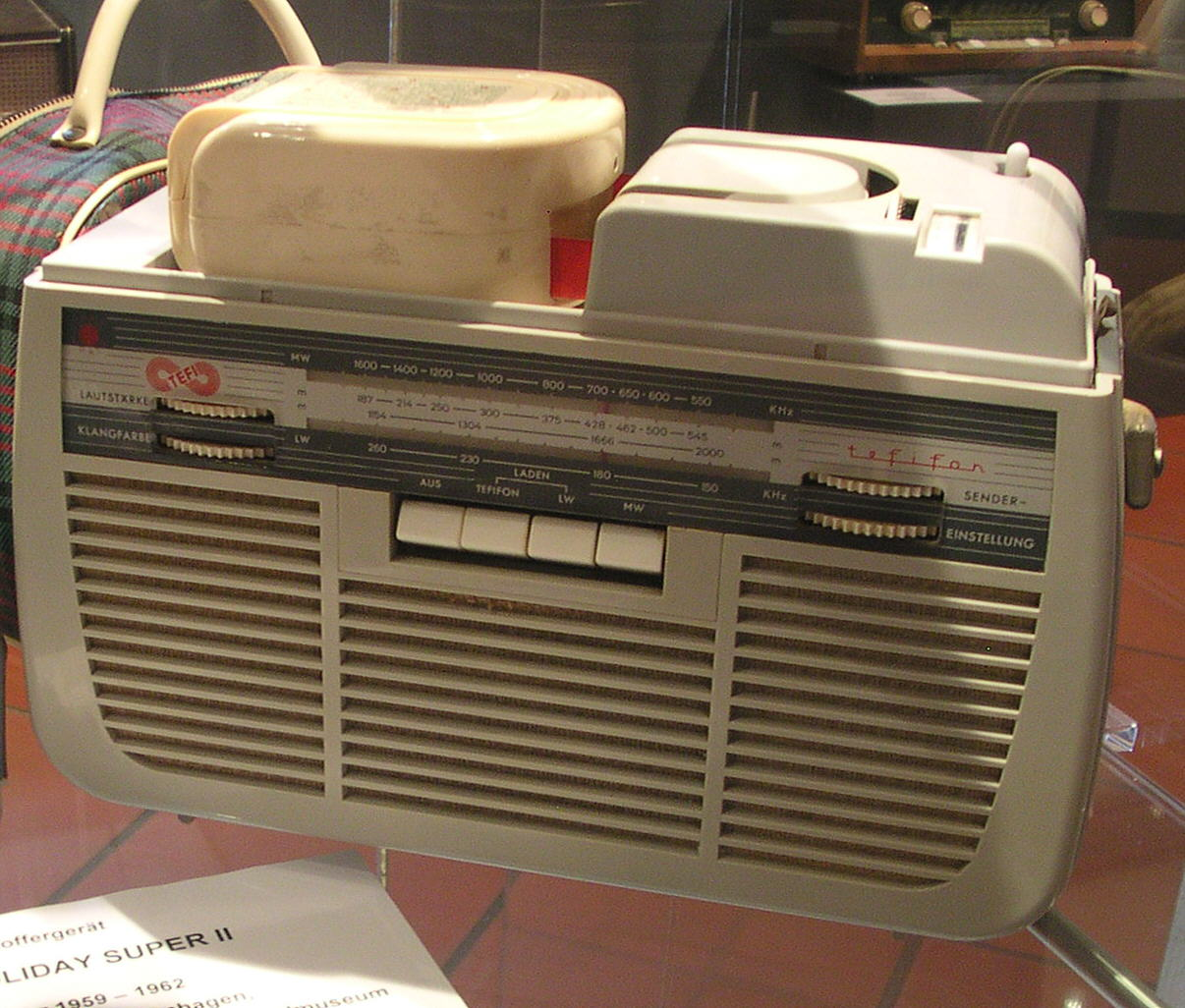
Tefifon portable radio with cartridge player (the Tefi "Holiday Super II")

The Tefifon is an audio playback format, developed and manufactured in Germany, that utilizes cartridges loaded with an endlessly looped reel of plastic tape. It is somewhat similar to the later 4-track and 8-track magnetic audio tape cartridges, but with grooves engraved into the tape, like a phonograph record. The grooves were engraved in a helical fashion across the width of the tape, in a manner similar to Dictaphone's Dictabelt format. The grooves are read with a stylus and amplified pickup in the player's transport. A Tefifon cartridge, known as a "Tefi", can hold up to four hours of music; therefore, most releases for the format are usually compilations of popular hits or dance music, operas, and operettas. Tefifon players were not sold by television and radio dealers in Germany, but rather sold directly by special sales outlets affiliated with Tefi (the manufacturer of the format).

== History ==
=== 1930s ===
The Tefifon format was developed by the German entrepreneur Dr. Karl Daniel and his "Tefi" company in 1936. A few years earlier, devices using phonographic grooved tape like the Tefifon were produced by Tefi for special purposes, like the military, and were designed for voice recording. Prior to the Tefifon's introduction, Tefi had introduced a device capable of recording and playback under the name "Tefiphon" (note the alternate spelling) and another device only capable of playback under the name "Teficord". Both use loose tape, unlike the cartridge-loaded tape of the Tefifon.

In 1937, a half-speed 9.5 CPS (3-3/4 IPS) format was developed for talking books for the blind in the early run-up to World War II. This was continued, albeit scaled back until vinyl disc technology could catch up in quality if not time, since the 4-hour Tefi cartridges recorded at 19 CPS (7-1/2 IPS) could carry 4 hours, the talking book could carry twice that, or eight hours.

With no way to get an eight-hour recording done all in one session with no mistakes, these extremely long programs were transcribed first onto 15-minute cartridges (30 minutes of Talking Book) and later 1-hour cartridges (2-hour Talking Book) and then assembled by playing them back in succession much as a long radio program is spread over many sides and assembled later on-air to sound as if the whole thing is live.

=== 1940s ===
The first Tefifon players and cartridges for home use came available in the German market towards the end of the 1940s, but could not compete with the popular phonographic disc format readily available at the time. One reason was that well-known artists were committed exclusively by contract to major record companies, most of which had no interest in offering their artists' albums on Tefifon tapes. As a result, most Tefifon releases were of relatively unknown bands and artists. In addition, the Tefifon saw competition from phonographs equipped with record changers, some of which could allow for up to three hours of music without interruption.

=== 1950s ===
The Tefifon was offered in the 1950s as a standalone device, but also in combination with various types of radios, including portable and home models. The chassis of the radio sets were often purchased ready-made from third parties, with a Tefifon playback transport being added to it as a finished product. The sound quality of Tefifon tapes is superior to 78 rpm records made of shellac, but is still less than that of 33 rpm LP records made of vinyl. In addition, the mechanical stress on the stylus and supporting cantilever is quite strong, so this wears out relatively quickly.

=== 1960s ===
The last innovation of the Tefifon format was in 1961, with the introduction of stereo sound, but this was not commercially successful. Tefifon production at its main plant in Porz am Rhein was halted in 1965. Afterward, the rights to the name were acquired by the Neckermann mail-order company, which also took over the sale of existing Tefifon products. Even though the Tefifon was little-known outside of Germany, it was imported and sold in the United States for a very short time by Western Electric's Westrex division from 1963 to 1964 under the "Westrex" name.

== Technical details ==
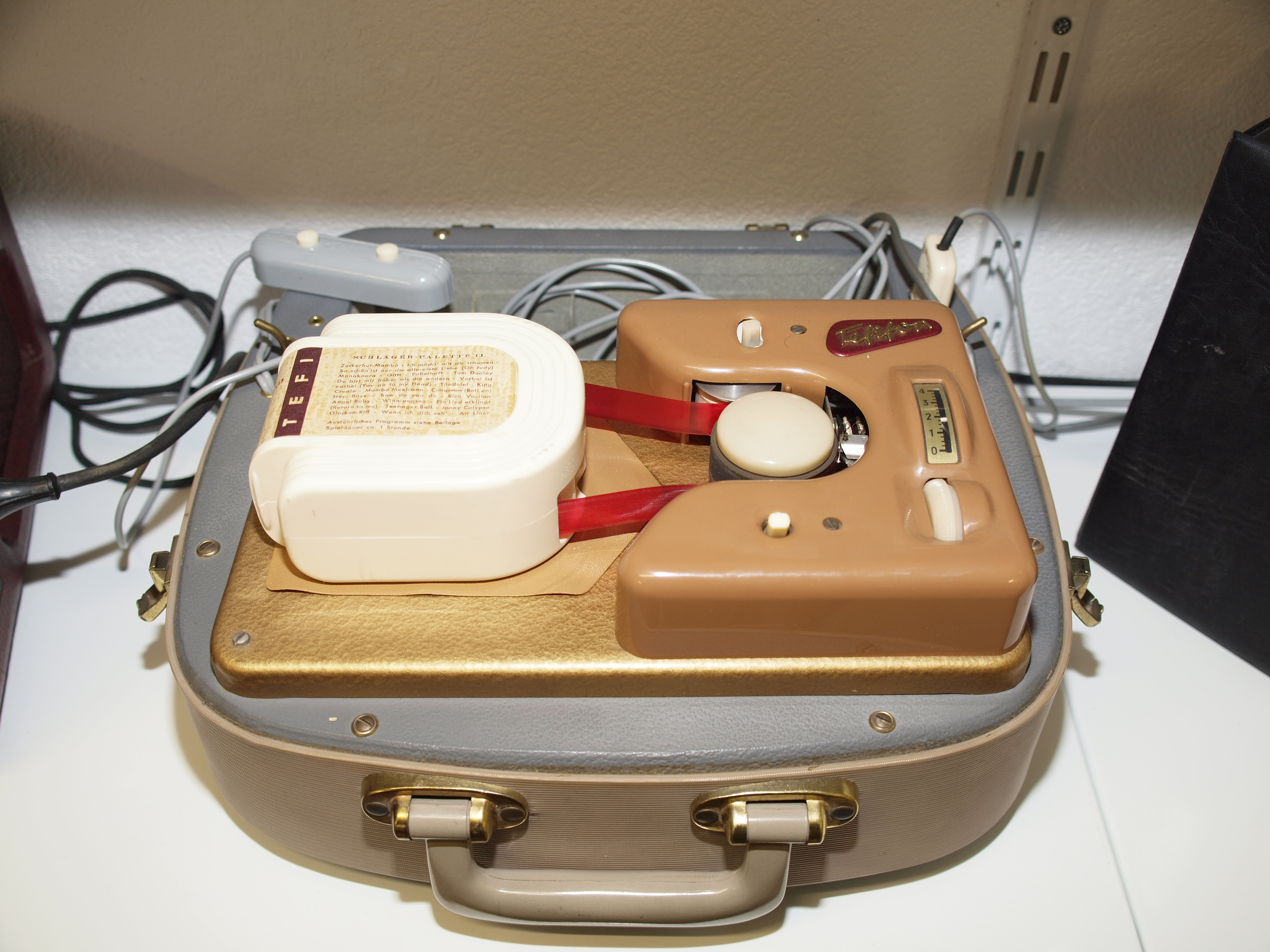
A stand-alone Tefifon player with cartridge loaded

Tefifon cartridges were made in four sizes:

- A 'single' size loop of tape which carried about four minutes of audio under the name "Tefi Kurz Band" (A special adapter was needed to play these, similarly to 45-RPM records)
- A small size with 15 minutes of audio.
- A medium size, with an hour of audio.
- A large size, with 4 hours of audio.

The larger cartridge also had several differences from the smaller units. It featured a spring to assist in removing the tape for playback, and a plastic cover over the tape to protect it. The cartridges also have a cardboard protective case.

A Tefifon cartridge would be inserted into the machine, with the reader tape around the capstan. The machine would then be started. The tape would be read with a stylus, which moved across the grooves, in a manner similar to a phonograph record. However, the tape would be stored in a cartridge, like later magnetic tape systems. While there was no way of moving to a specific track, the stylus could be moved to a variety of positions on the tape.

== Gallery ==
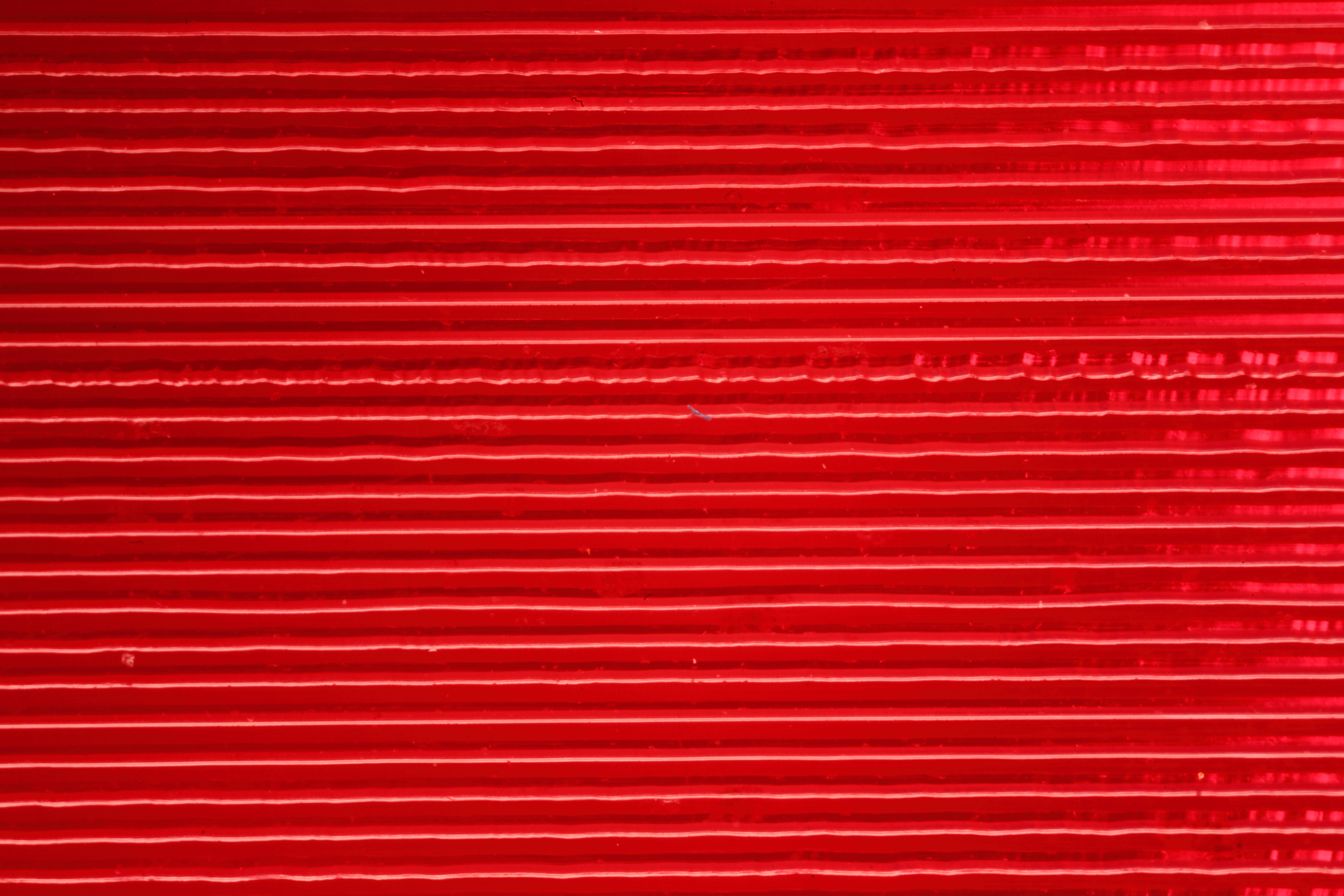
A close up of the Tefifon's grooved tape medium.

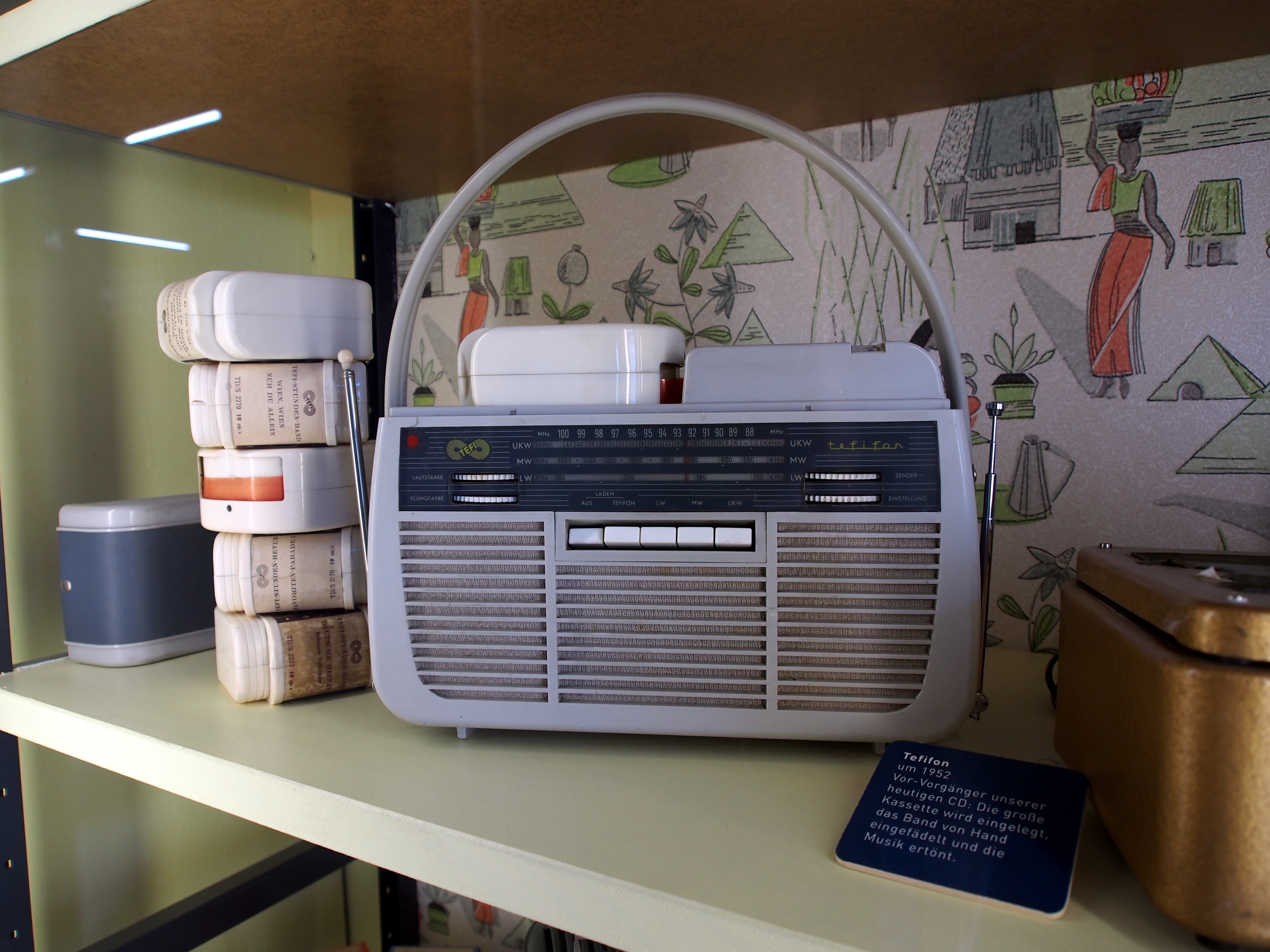
A Tefifon unit next to several cartridges.

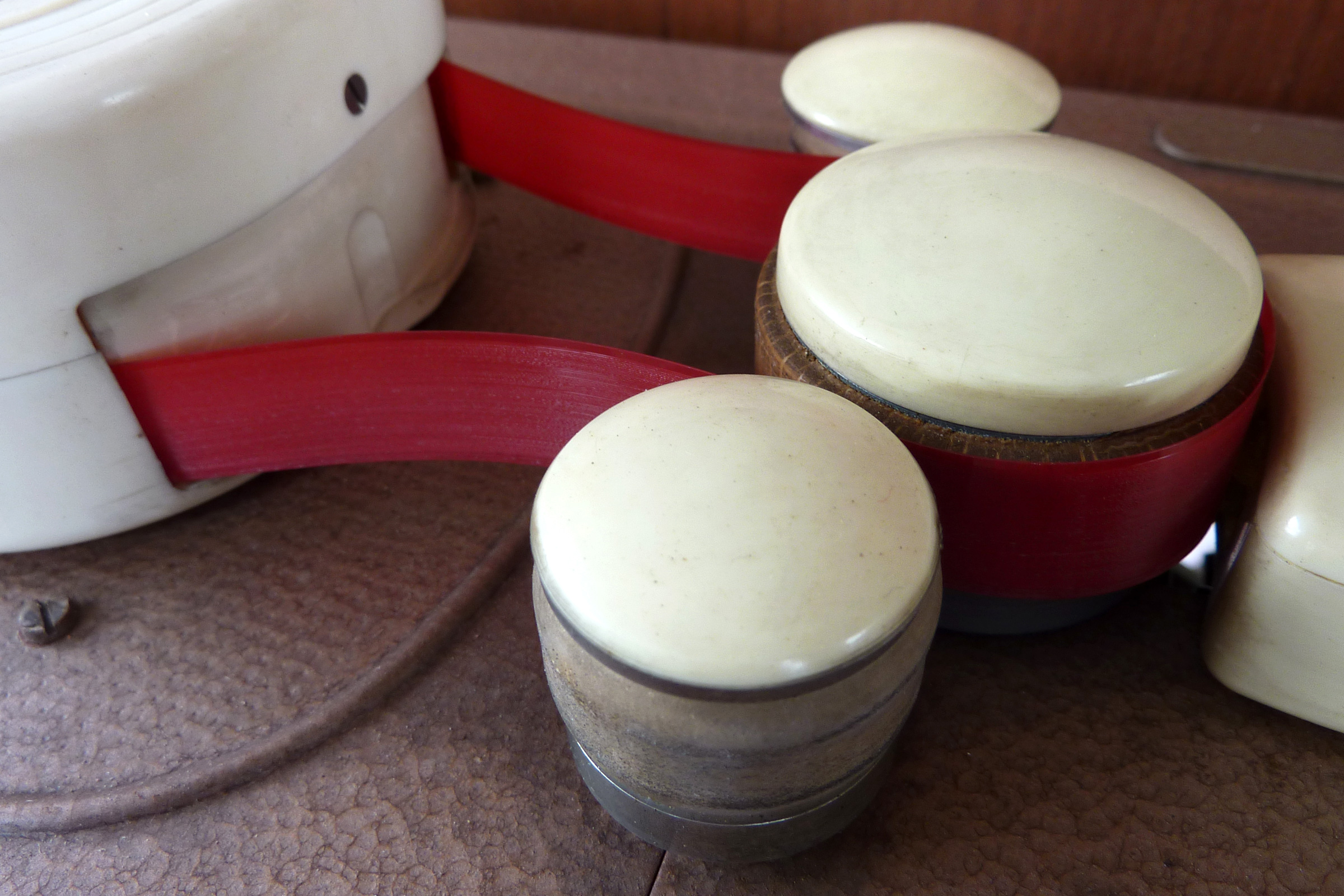
A close up of a Tefifon cartridge in the reader.

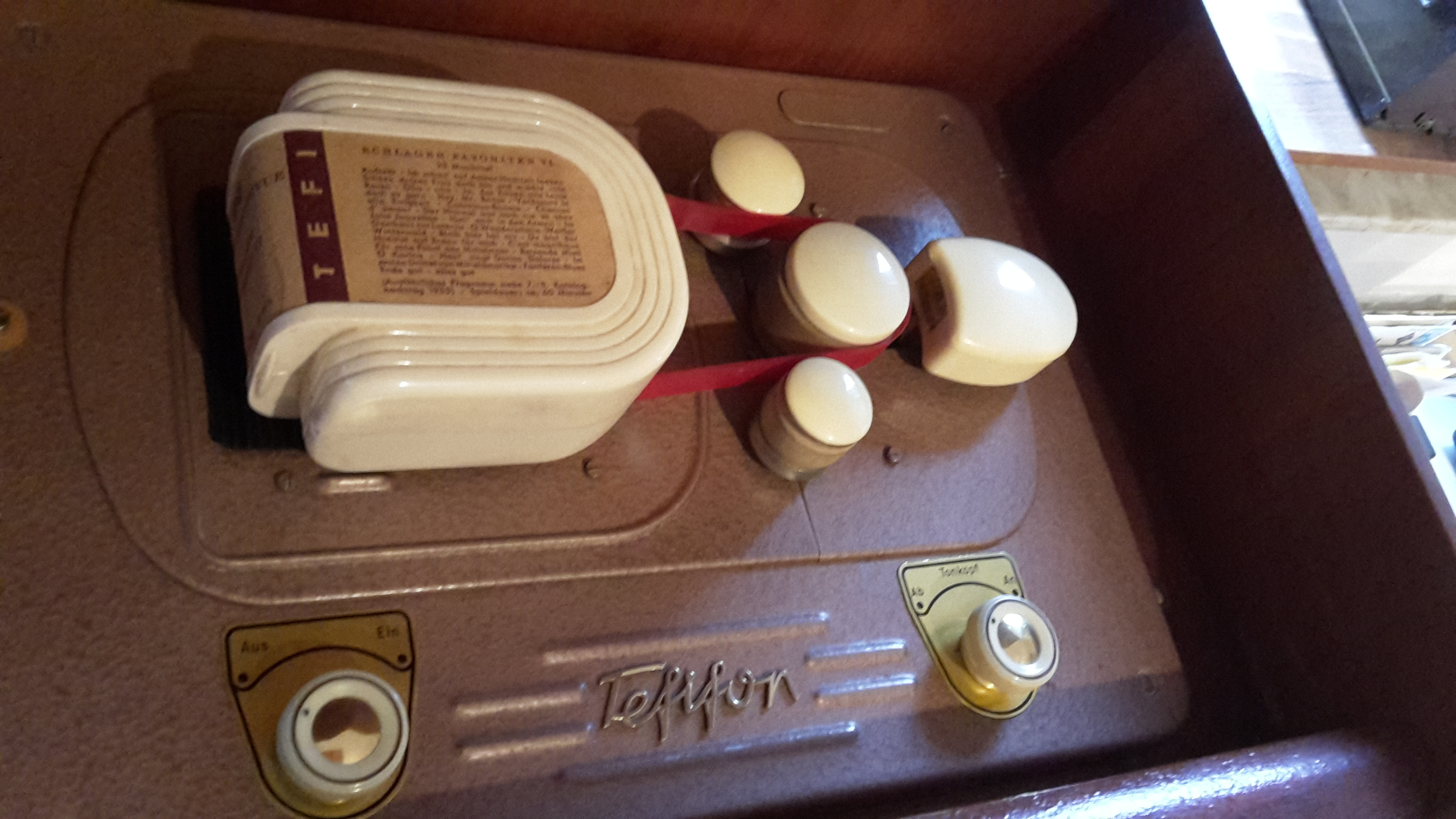
A Tefifon unit in operation.

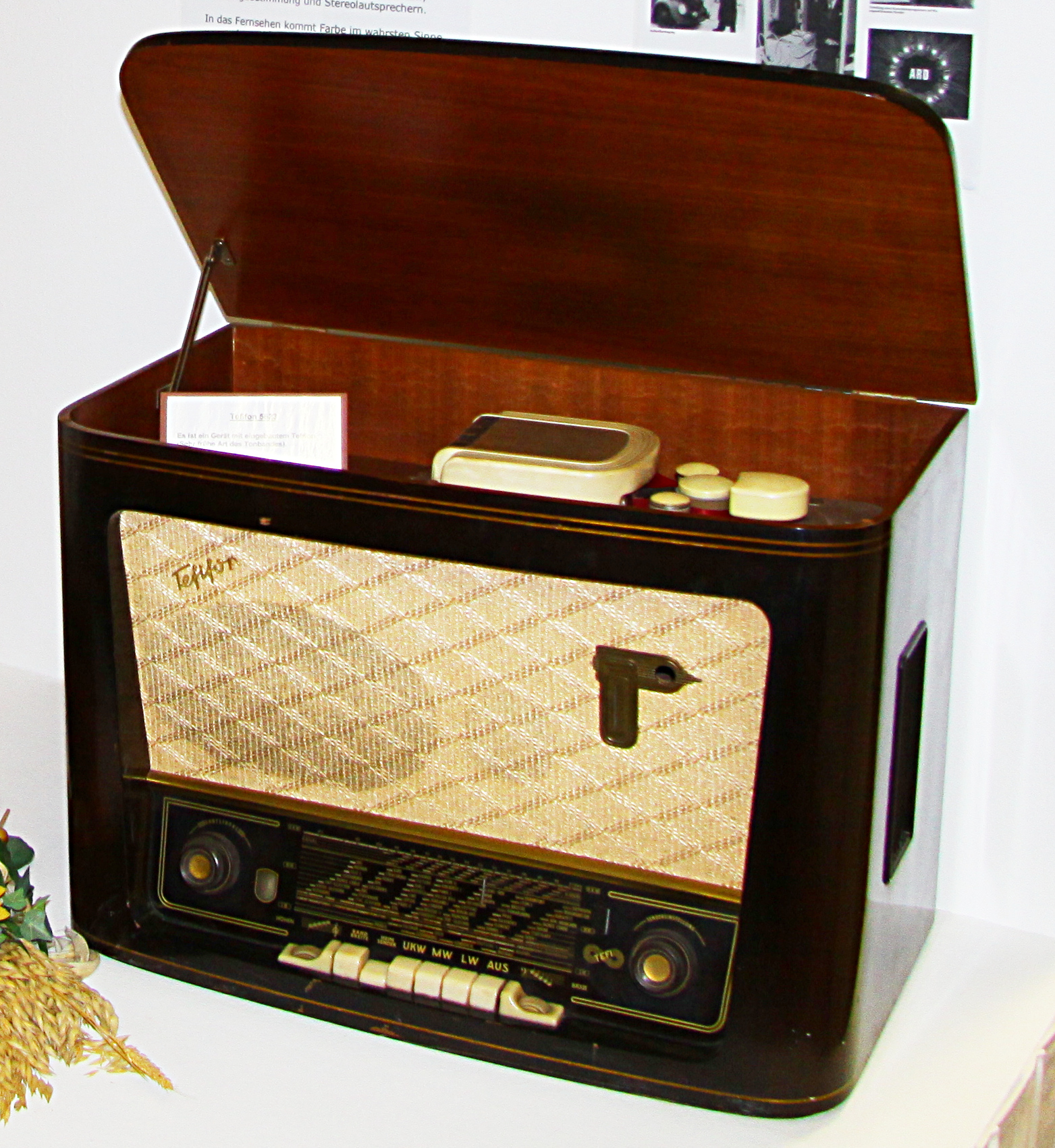
An example of a combination Tefifon player and radio.

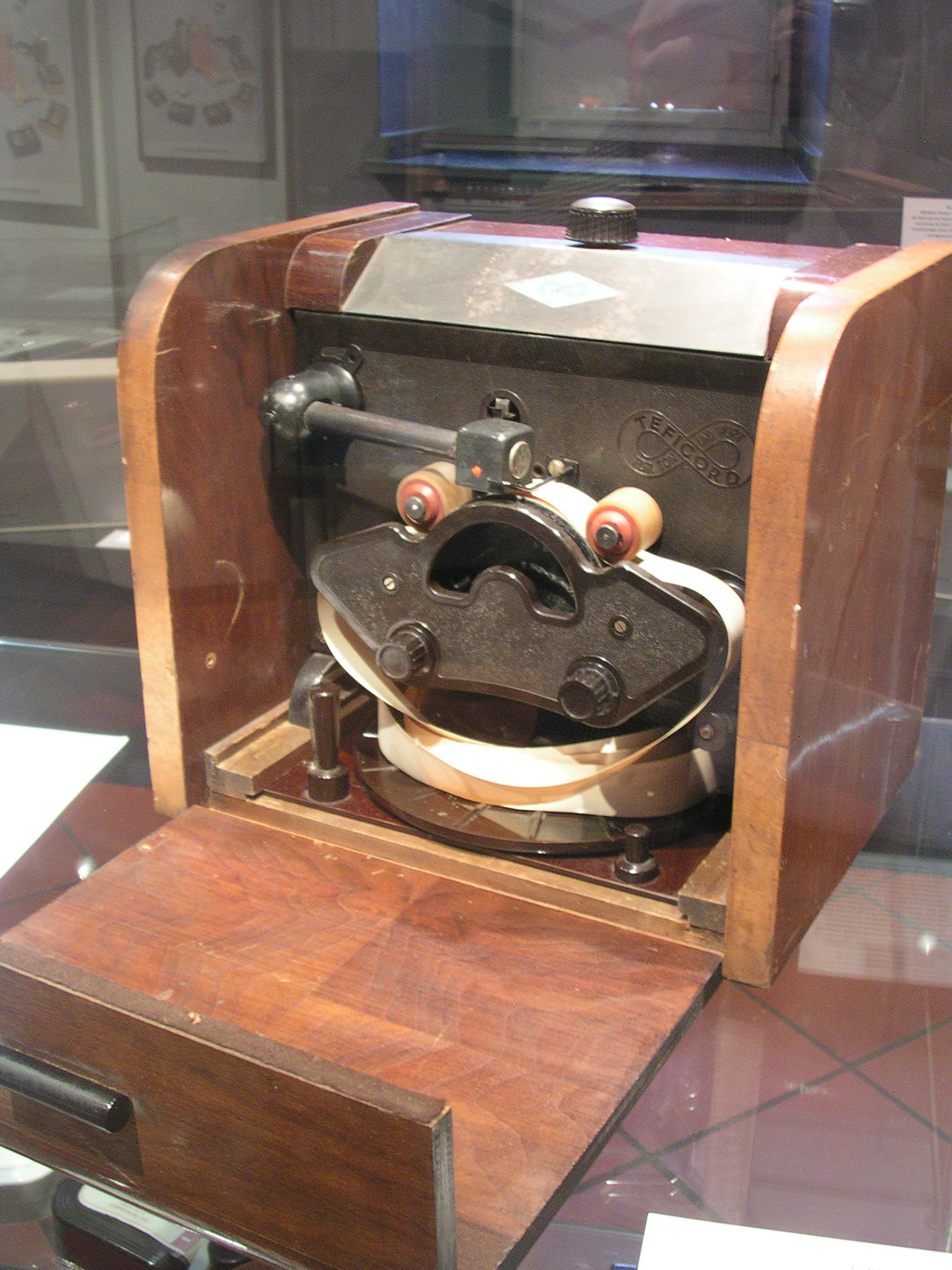
A predecessor of the Tefifon, Teficord.
