= One Worldwide Plaza =

Office skyscraper in Manhattan, New York

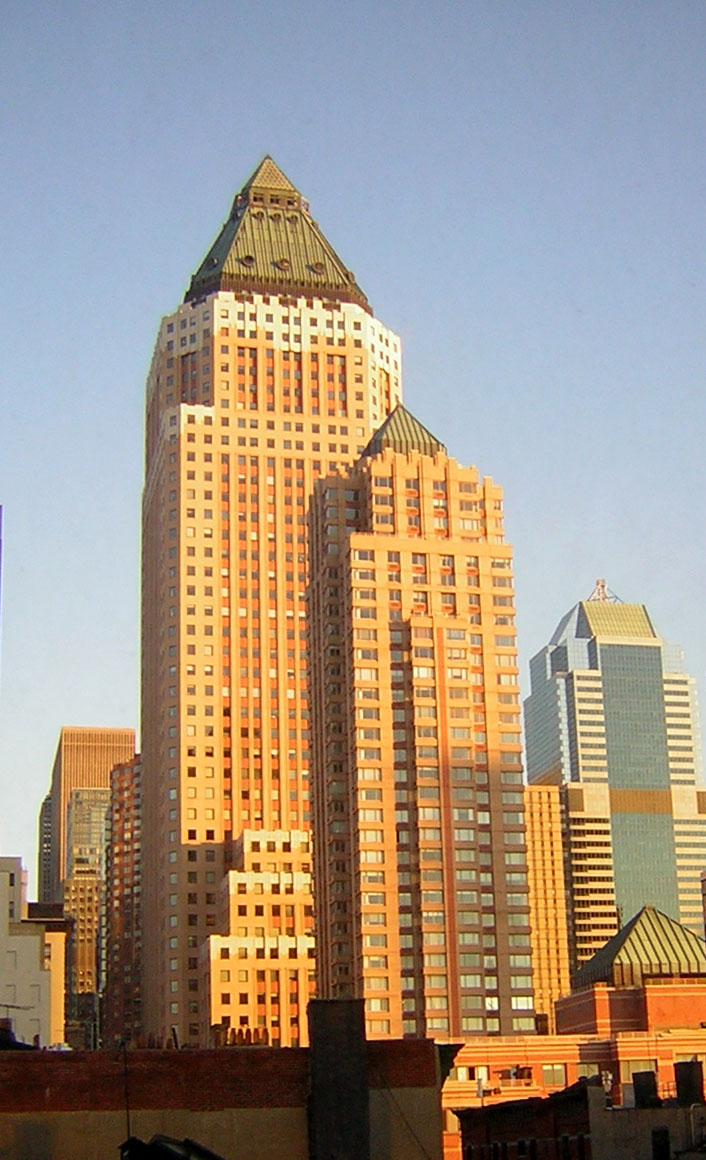
- The Worldwide Plaza complex in 2007. One Worldwide Plaza is in the left background, while Two Worldwide Plaza is in the center. The short roofs of Three Worldwide Plaza are visible at right (with 1585 Broadway in the background).
- Interactive map of the One Worldwide Plaza area

General information
- Type: Office building
- Architectural style: Postmodernism
- Location: 825 8th Avenue; Manhattan, New York City
- Coordinates: 40°45′44″N 73°59′13″W
- Construction started: November 12, 1986
- Topped-out: May 20, 1988
- Completed: June 1989
- Owner: New York REIT

Height
- Roof: 778 ft (237 m)

Technical details
- Floor count: 50
- Floor area: 1,706,187 sq ft (158,510.0 m^{2})

Design and construction
- Architect: David Childs of Skidmore, Owings and Merrill
- Developer: William Zeckendorf Jr.
- Main contractor: HRH Construction

One Worldwide Plaza is an office skyscraper in the Hell's Kitchen neighborhood of Manhattan in New York City. Designed by David Childs of Skidmore, Owings & Merrill (SOM), One Worldwide Plaza is 778 feet (237 m) tall, with an alternative address of 825 Eighth Avenue. It is the easternmost of three buildings in Worldwide Plaza, a commercial and residential complex that occupies the entire city block bounded by Eighth Avenue, Ninth Avenue, 49th Street, and 50th Street and is built on the site of New York City's third Madison Square Garden. Adjacent to One Worldwide Plaza to the west are a public plaza and two residential buildings.

The classically inspired building contains a three-story granite base, a brick midsection with setbacks, and a pyramidal copper roof with a glass lantern. Inside, there are storefronts and entrances to the New York City Subway's 50th Street station, while three double-height lobbies lead to different sets of office floors.

Worldwide Plaza was developed in the late 1980s by a syndicate led by William Zeckendorf Jr. Upon opening, One Worldwide Plaza was nearly fully occupied, with two anchor tenants: advertising agency Ogilvy & Mather and law firm Cravath, Swaine & Moore. During the mid-1990s, the office space was leased at a very low price. The Blackstone Group acquired the complex in 1996 and sold it to Equity Office Properties in 1998. When Blackstone took over Equity Office in 2007, it sold the office building to Harry Macklowe, who lost the building to foreclosure. George Comfort and Sons took over One Worldwide Plaza in 2009. American Realty Capital New York bought a controlling ownership stake in 2017, selling off a non-controlling stake to RXR Realty and SL Green Realty.

== Site ==
One Worldwide Plaza is part of Worldwide Plaza, which occupies the entire city block bounded by Eighth Avenue, Ninth Avenue, 49th Street, and 50th Street in the Hell's Kitchen neighborhood of Manhattan in New York City. Worldwide Plaza was developed in the late 1980s by a syndicate led by William Zeckendorf Jr. One Worldwide Plaza, the easternmost structure in the complex, was designed by David Childs of Skidmore, Owings & Merrill (SOM). To the west are two residential buildings, Two and Three Worldwide Plaza, both designed by Frank Williams; they are respectively composed of a 39-story tower and a series of five- and six-story-tall townhouses. In addition, the complex contains 57,000 square feet (5,300 m^{2}) of retail space, as well as theaters and a garage. According to Zeckendorf, Worldwide Plaza was intended to be "a self-contained community and also a destination point for other people in the city".

The Worldwide Plaza complex is built on the site of New York City's third Madison Square Garden (MSG). Following the opening of the current Madison Square Garden arena at 34th Street, the former arena was closed in 1968 and demolished. By the 1980s, the surrounding area consisted mostly of lower-income tenements and small retail buildings, and The New York Times described the area as "a neighborhood best known for pornography and cheap bars".

== Architecture ==
One Worldwide Plaza is a 50-story (Note: Reynolds 1994, p. 184, cited One Worldwide Plaza as containing 49 stories.) office skyscraper measuring 778 feet (237 m) high, with a pyramidal roof at its top. Several architectural details of One Worldwide Plaza were inspired by early-1930s classical designs, specifically the Art Deco style. The building is divided horizontally into three sections: a base, shaft, and capital. The materials used in its construction were sourced from a variety of locations. The brick was manufactured by Glen-Gery at a factory in Pennsylvania, while the windows were made in Wisconsin. By contrast, the roofing and precast concrete were made in Canada, the structural steel was bought in Luxembourg, and the project used Brazilian granite and Italian marble. HRH Construction was the building's general construction contractor.

Including the residential buildings, the complex was to cover 2 million square feet (190,000 m^{2}), more than the maximum size allowed without zoning bonuses. Under normal zoning regulations, the maximum floor area ratio (FAR) for any building on Worldwide Plaza's site was 10, but the developers received two bonuses of 2 FAR each, bringing the FAR to 14. The developers added a midblock plaza for the first bonus and renovated the adjacent 50th Street station for the second bonus.

=== Facade ===
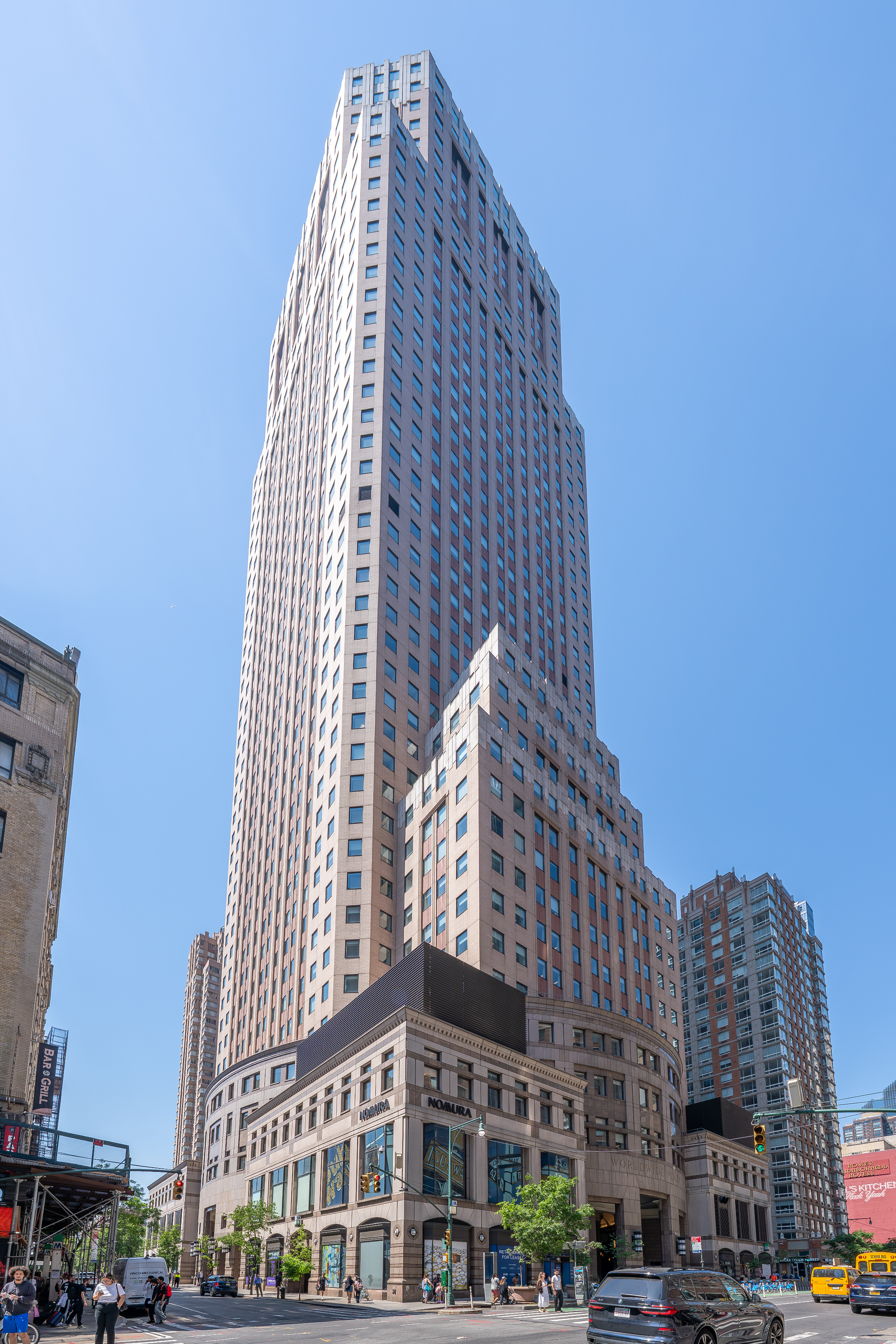
The facade as seen from street level

The base of the building is three stories tall and is designed to relate to the neighboring residential buildings. It is clad with gray-purple granite and contains outwardly curved entrances on all four sides. These curved sections contain Renaissance-inspired colonnades with granite pilasters, behind which is an oval passageway with a vaulted ceiling. The building's two original anchor tenants, advertising agency Ogilvy & Mather and law firm Cravath, Swaine & Moore, had their own entrances. This was because Ogilvy & Mather had requested a private entrance during the building's construction. Ogilvy & Mather's entrance faced 49th Street; Cravath, Swaine & Moore's entrance faced Eighth Avenue; and other tenants had an entrance facing west. The entrance on the northern elevation, facing 50th Street, is used for retail rather than as an office lobby.

The rest of the facade is made largely of brick and is designed in a manner reminiscent of the Gothic Revival style. Glen-Gery was hired to manufacture the brick because it was one of the few contractors capable of manufacturing the tinted brick that the developers wanted. The main section of the building is clad with maize-colored brick, but the windows at the center of each elevation are emphasized by vertical strips of rust-colored brick. The facade originally contained single-paned windows, which gave the effect of a flat facade. The building contains several setbacks, which are decorated with white brick that is designed to evoke the appearance of stone. The building's shallow setbacks give it a much larger floor area than older Art Deco skyscrapers in New York City, which had deeper setbacks and consequently less interior space.

The tower is topped by a pyramidal copper roof with round dormer windows. The pyramid has eight sides and measures 150 feet (46 m) tall. The design of the roof was inspired by the pyramidal roofs of several other New York City office buildings in the early 20th century, such as the New York Life Building and the Helmsley Building. The building is crowned by a pyramidal glass lantern.

=== Interior ===
David Childs designed three lobbies at One Worldwide Plaza, each with a separate entrance. Each lobby was originally decorated with Fiore di Pesco marble. There are storefronts along the ground-level colonnade adjacent to the three lobbies, as well as on both levels of each lobby. In addition, there are restrooms along the western side of the arcade. The two-story-high lobby on Eighth Avenue was used by Cravath, Swaine & Moore, which installed security checkpoints on both levels of the lobby, reducing the amount of retail space there. On each side, visitors had to take an escalator from ground level to the upper lobby, where they could access the elevators. Each lobby had access to a bank of elevators. There are four elevator banks in total, comprising 22 passenger elevators and two truck elevators. The building's base also contained a day-care center sponsored by Cravath, Swaine & Moore for its employees' children. Northwest of the lobbies is a truck elevator on 50th Street.

The building contains a steel superstructure weighing 19,000 short tons (17,000 long tons; 17,000 t). Each floor slab is made of concrete, which is poured onto a metal deck. The floor slabs measure 165 by 165 feet (50 by 50 m). The maximum structural load on each column was 2,000 short tons (1,800 long tons; 1,800 t) on average. These loads were carried down into the concrete spread footings at the building's foundation. The superstructure was stiffened by moment frames at the building's perimeter, which were braced to the elevator core. Concrete masonry units were then installed around the outermost beams of the superstructure, providing waterproofing.

One Worldwide Plaza contains 1.5 million square feet (140,000 m^{2}) of office space. The upper stories each have 20,000 to 72,000 square feet (1,900 to 6,700 m^{2}) of rentable space. Each story has an open plan, and the slab-to-slab height of each story is 13 feet (4.0 m). The restrooms, staircases, and elevators are clustered near the building's core. The banks of elevators taper off at higher levels. For example, the 21st and 28th stories have space for three banks of elevators, although only two elevator banks serve these levels. Cravath, Swaine & Moore originally occupied the 38th to 49th stories. The New York Times described the offices as using 50 short tons (45 long tons; 45 t) of marble and 1,285,000 square feet (119,400 m^{2}) of mahogany.

=== Other features ===
==== Public plaza ====
A mid-block public plaza separates One Worldwide Plaza from Two and Three Worldwide Plaza. The New York City Department of City Planning (DCP) had approved the construction and maintenance of the public plaza in exchange for additional floors in the office tower. The plaza originally covered 26,800 square feet (2,490 m^{2}), but its owner reduced the plaza's size by 10 percent in 2002 as part of a lawsuit settlement. During the summer, the plaza hosts the Worldwide Plaza Summer Concert Series. Jerold S. Kayden wrote of the buildings' plaza: "Its half-acre size, numerous movable chairs, comfortable ledge seating, food service at north and south ends, decorative water fountain, and landscaping of trees and shrubs render it highly functional for the diverse audience."

The landscaping of the plaza includes over 40 trees, numerous plantings, and seating. The plaza also contains a fountain called The Four Seasons, which was designed by sculptor Sidney Simon. Four bronze statues of standing nude women, each representing a season, hold up a globe. The statues were modeled by Molly Ackerman, a student of Richard Pousette Dart at the Art Students League of New York who became an expansionist painter and went to Leiden in the Netherlands. Below the globe are four fountains, each carved in the shape of a man's head.

==== Amenities ====
The complex also has a health club measuring 35,000 square feet (3,300 m^{2}). The health club was originally operated by Bally Health and Tennis. Beneath the plaza is a parking garage with 450 or 473 parking spaces.

Beneath the public plaza, there was originally a multiplex cinema with six screens, operated by the Cineplex Odeon Corporation. The multiplex's lobby was just below ground level, while the auditoriums themselves were in the second basement level. The cinema operated until 2001 and was converted into New World Stages, a complex of five Off-Broadway theaters, in 2004. The multiplex was completely reconstructed as part of that project. The modern theatrical complex contains a double-level lobby, accessed by escalators from 50th Street.

==== Subway entrance ====
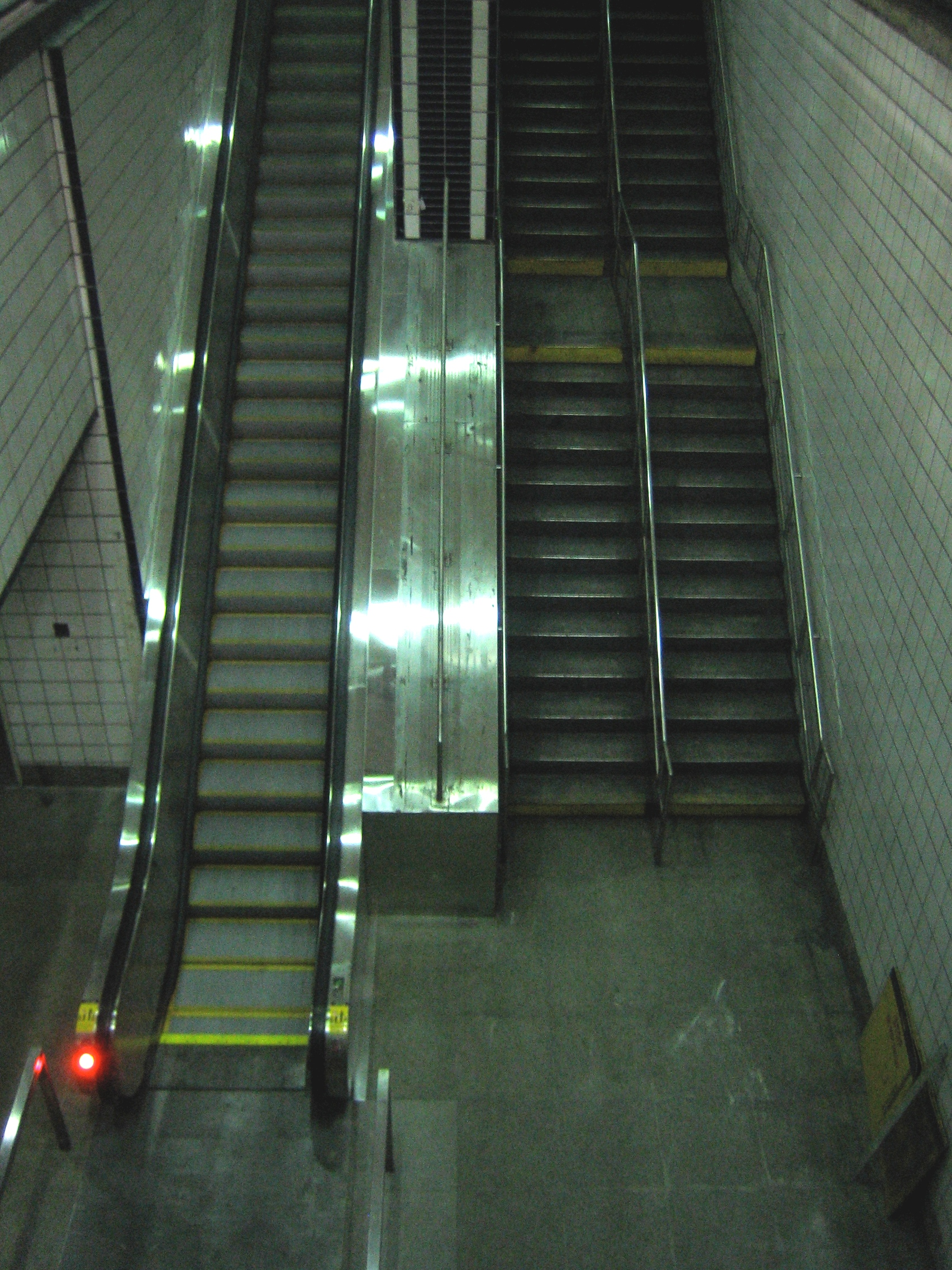
Escalator to the complex from the platform of the 50th Street station

One Worldwide Plaza's basement contains two entrances to the southbound platform of the 50th Street station of the New York City Subway, served by the C and E trains. There is an elevator entrance on 49th Street and an escalator entrance on 50th Street. The entrances were built in exchange for 162,000 square feet (15,100 m^{2}) of additional space. They contain a mezzanine, escalators, elevators, and stairs. The Zeckendorfs also commissioned artist Matt Mullican to create an etched-granite mural for the station, which cost $150,000. (Note: The cost of the mural is equivalent to $390,000 in 2025. (Note: 1634–1699: McCusker, J. J. (1997). How Much Is That in Real Money? A Historical Price Index for Use as a Deflator of Money Values in the Economy of the United States: Addenda et Corrigenda (PDF). American Antiquarian Society. 1700–1799: McCusker, J. J. (1992). How Much Is That in Real Money? A Historical Price Index for Use as a Deflator of Money Values in the Economy of the United States (PDF). American Antiquarian Society. 1800–present: Federal Reserve Bank of Minneapolis. "Consumer Price Index (estimate) 1800–".)) The mural, measuring 70 feet (21 m) tall, contains black relief panels depicting the site's history. A closed stairway on 49th Street was also refurbished as part of the project.

== History ==
=== Early proposals ===
After the third Madison Square Garden was demolished in 1968, the site was operated as a parking lot for nearly two decades. Several proposals for redeveloping the site had all failed due to a lack of funding. In 1966, a "Cinema City" with two office towers, two Broadway theaters, four movie theaters, and several film and recording studios was proposed for the site. Three years later, New York City Center proposed developing a four-theater complex, a film production center, and a new home for the American Film Institute on the site. In 1973, Cushman & Wakefield and Skidmore, Owings & Merrill were hired to study the feasibility of constructing a large commercial showroom complex on the site similar to the Merchandise Mart in Chicago or AmericasMart in Atlanta. The complex would be topped by a tower.

In December 1976, developers Frank Stanton and Victor Elmaleh of the World‐Wide Group proposed Hippodrome Park, an indoor amusement park that would cost $30 million. (Note: Equivalent to $170 million in 2025.) The name was a homage to the former New York Hippodrome. The amusement park would have been designed by Randall Duell and would have included a variety of rides, restaurants, and films. The structure would have been enclosed in glass, which would have allowed the park to operate year-round; it would also have contained a 500-seat parking lot in the basement. The City of New York was supportive of the project as part of its initiative to clean up nearby Times Square. Ultimately, the developers chose not to spend $12 million on an option for the site. (Note: Equivalent to $68 million in 2025.)

Conglomerate Gulf and Western Industries acquired control of the site in 1977 as part of its acquisition of the Madison Square Garden Corporation. The company devised plans in 1980 for a mixed-use project on the site, including an office building on Eighth Avenue and apartments on Ninth Avenue, both designed by SOM. Its proposal called for a three-story retail podium supporting a 52-story office building and two 60-story apartment towers; the development would have contained a combined 2.3 million square feet (210,000 m^{2}). Gulf and Western operated the site as a parking lot in the meantime. The company had decided to sell the site by 1984, as its long term strategy did not include the redevelopment of the old Madison Square Garden.

=== Development ===
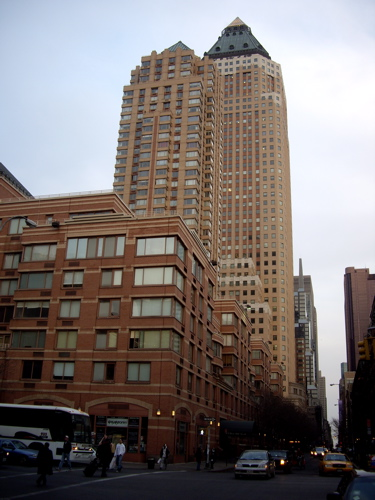
Looking east across Ninth Avenue and 49th Street in the foreground; 1 and 2 Worldwide Plaza are in the background

Gulf and Western sold the site to a group led by William Zeckendorf Jr. in December 1984 for $100 million. (Note: The sale price was equivalent to $310 million in 2025.) His partners in the project included Arthur G. Cohen, an independent real-estate investor; Victor Elmaleh and Frank Stanton, the principals of the World Wide Realty Corporation; and KG Land New York Corporation, a subsidiary of Japanese company Kumagai Gumi. The group had to raise a $12.5 million letter of credit and finalize their sale within 18 months. (Note: Equivalent to $38 million in 2025.) Zeckendorf and his partners announced in January 1985 that they had selected SOM to design the new complex. Zeckendorf hoped that the development would improve the character of Hell's Kitchen and Eighth Avenue, similar to how the construction of Axa Equitable Center four blocks northeast was intended to improve Seventh Avenue. It was one of several development projects planned within Hell's Kitchen, which at the time was characterized by physical decay and high crime. Zeckendorf said of Hell's Kitchen: "Ten years from now people will look back and marvel at how bad this neighborhood was."

==== Planning ====
SOM began designing the project in early 1985. The advertising agency Ogilvy & Mather, which was negotiating to lease a large amount of space in the building, was involved in the design. Zeckendorf's syndicate announced in November 1985 that it would erect a mixed-use complex on the MSG site, costing $500 million. (Note: The plans would have cost the equivalent of $1,497 million in 2025.) The complex would include a 45-story office building on Eighth Avenue, as well as a 38-story condominium tower and several 6- and 7-story residential buildings to the west. There would also be six underground movie theaters, a health club, and a 450-space parking garage. Ogilvy would occupy 600,000 square feet (56,000 m^{2}) in the office building. Ogilvy provided additional funds for the complex's construction in exchange for a 17 percent equity stake and some of One Worldwide Plaza's income. In addition, the complex would receive an eight-year, $60 million tax abatement. The developers obtained two zoning bonuses for the site by adding a midblock plaza and renovating the 50th Street station.

Members of the local Manhattan Community Board 4 opposed Zeckendorf's project, citing the buildings' height and the lack of low- and moderate-income housing. Community members also raised concerns that the development would cause gentrification by pushing out lower-income tenants and family businesses. Some residents protested the project by requesting that Ogilvy & Mather withdraw from the project. Zeckendorf Company officials began negotiating with community board members "the day after" the board announced its opposition, and Zeckendorf announced in early 1986 that he would add affordable housing to the neighborhood. He proposed renovating 132 apartments in other parts of the neighborhood, rather than adding these apartments to his new development. Zeckendorf made six other modifications to the project to improve neighborhood residents' quality of life, including storefronts for local merchants, a day-care center, and job training.

In July 1986, the New York City Board of Estimate approved Zeckendorf's development. Manhattan borough president David Dinkins, a supporter of the project, said the developers could not sell 60 of the complex's luxury units until all of the affordable units had been sold. The developers had to acquire another 70 affordable units to provide enough affordable housing for the complex. They ultimately fulfilled this requirement by acquiring six buildings on the block to the south. That October, Gulf and Western finalized its sale of the site to the joint venture of Zeckendorf, Cohen, KG Land, and Worldwide Holdings Corp. Zeckendorf also leased the theatrical complex to the Cineplex Odeon Corporation.

==== Construction ====
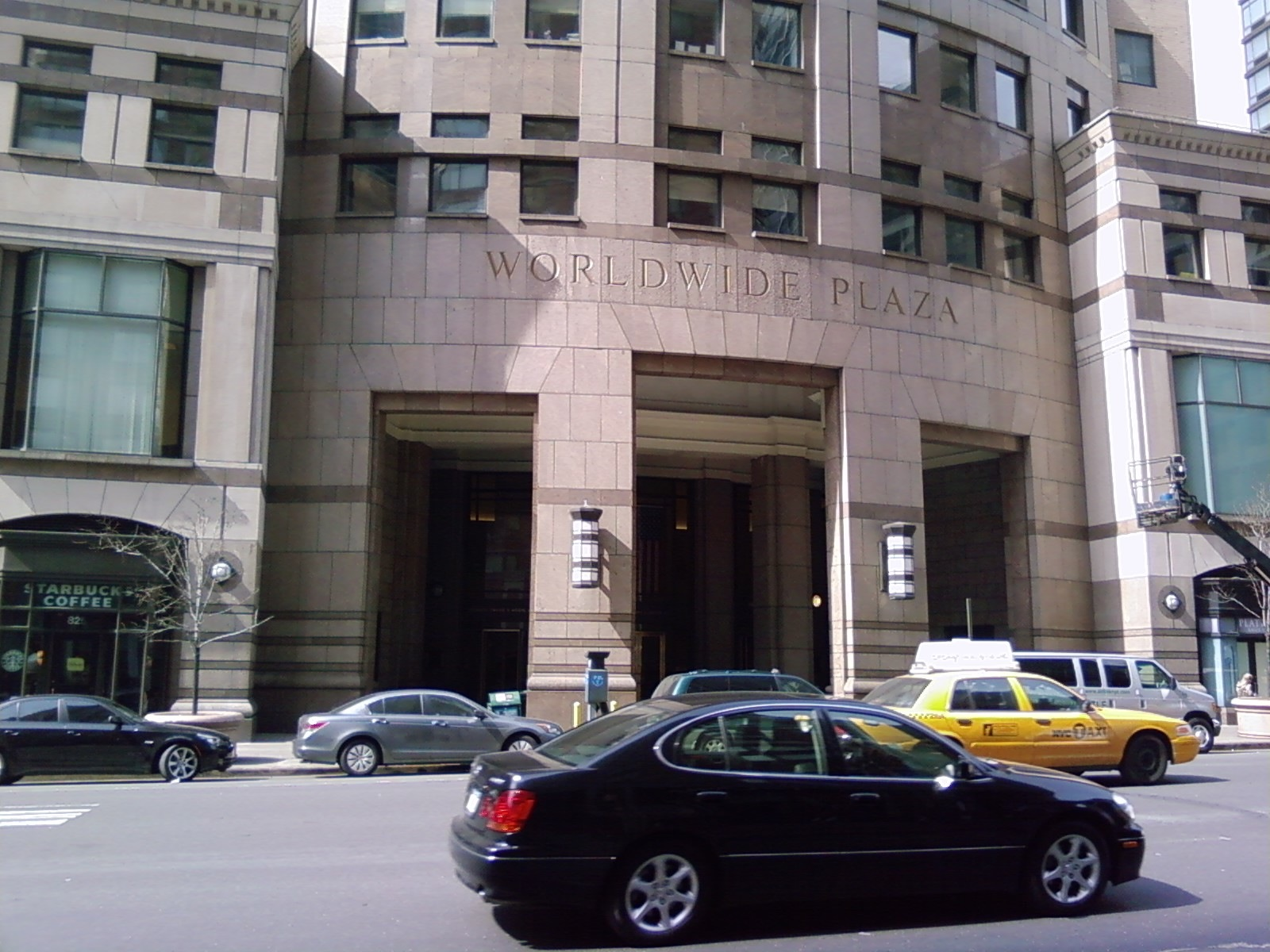
Facade and main entrance on 8th Avenue

A groundbreaking ceremony for the complex was held on November 12, 1986. That month, workers began excavating the site to 17 feet below grade; the excavation was completed by February 1987. Newsday reported that the development of Worldwide Plaza would relocate the western boundary of Midtown Manhattan westward to Eighth Avenue. In June 1987, the Sonnenblick-Goldman Corporation secured a $545 million construction loan (Note: The face value of the loan in 1987 would be equivalent to $1,544 million in 2025.) from a syndicate of 15 banks (Note: The bank group included Mitsubishi Bank, Hokkaido Takushoku Bank, the Long-Term Credit Bank of Japan, The Bank of Tokyo, Tokai Bank, Sanwa Bank, Taiyo Kobe Bank, Deutsche Bank, Swiss Bank Corporation, Canadian Imperial Bank of Commerce, Bank of Montreal, Manufacturers Hanover Corporation, Irving Trust, Chemical Bank, and Lincoln Savings Bank.) in the United States, Japan, Canada, and Europe. The financing was one of the largest real estate loans in New York City history. In exchange for receiving the loan, the development group provided a letter of credit and personal guarantees worth $100 million. (Note: Equivalent to $283 million in 2025.) The Wall Street Journal described the loan as part of a trend wherein "the mere mention of a Zeckendorf project had bankers falling over each other to offer financing".

At the time of Worldwide Plaza's development, demand for office space in New York City had declined following Black Monday in 1987. The design of One Worldwide Plaza's basement and ground level was impacted by the location of the new subway entrances at the base. While the developers negotiated with the New York City Transit Authority (NYCTA) for a year and a half, contractors started pouring the foundations. The concrete for the foundation was poured by April 1987, and work on the steel superstructure began the following month.

The construction of the complex proceeded as scheduled until July 1987, when ironworkers went on strike for three weeks, delaying the project by approximately one month. By the end of 1987, it was taking longer than expected to install the stonework inside the lobby. Installation of the exterior masonry had fallen three months behind schedule and did not commence until February 1988. The stonework ultimately cost significantly more than HRH Construction's original estimate.

==== Completion ====
One Worldwide Plaza was topped-out with a ceremony on May 20, 1988, in which ironworkers inscribed their names on a beam that was then lifted to the roof. Work on the interior finishes began that month. The interior fit-out of Ogilvy's offices, originally slated to begin in April 1988, did not begin until that November. The completion of Worldwide Plaza was ultimately delayed by four months and exceeded the original budget by 10 percent.

Most of the space at One Worldwide Plaza was leased even before the building was completed. In August 1988, the law firm Cravath, Swaine & Moore leased 370,000 square feet (34,000 m^{2}) in exchange for a 7 percent equity stake in Worldwide Plaza. The lease occurred at a time when the offices of all of Manhattan's accounting firms and corporate law firms were east of Sixth Avenue. The law firm's lease also stipulated that Zeckendorf buy and demolish an adult movie theater just north of One Worldwide Plaza. Cravath, Swaine & Moore and Ogilvy & Mather each had their own entrances and elevators, and the developers gave large "work letters" to both firms, compensating for the cost of interior furnishings. These two tenants alone accounted for 55 percent of the space. By early 1989, more than 90 percent of the space at One Worldwide Plaza had been leased. Advertising agency N. W. Ayer & Son agreed to move into 335,000 square feet (31,100 m^{2}) at One Worldwide Plaza, and it also took an equity stake in the complex. Record label PolyGram had leased 120,000 square feet (11,000 m^{2}).

=== Opening and early years ===
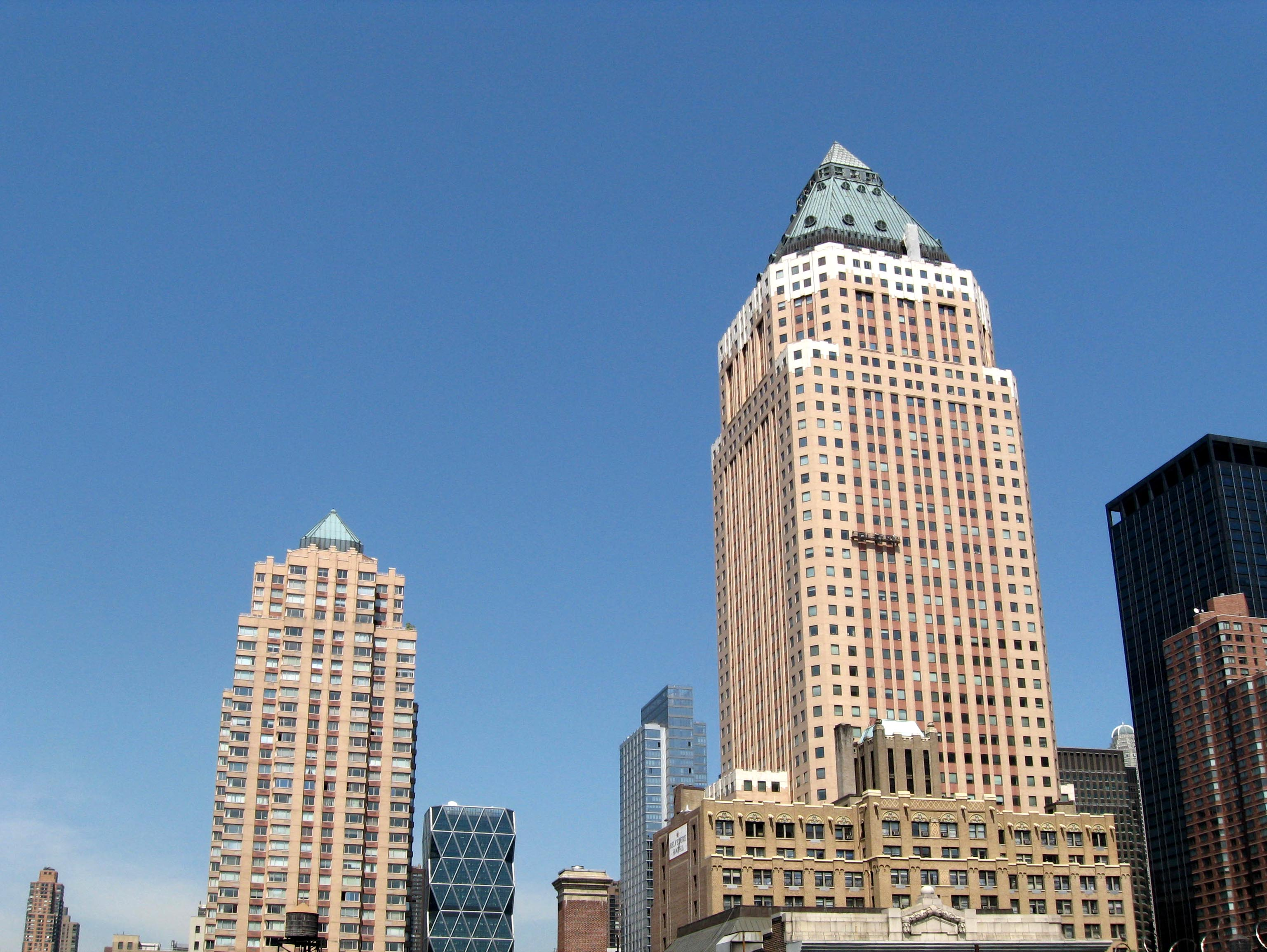
Southeast side of Worldwide Plaza

Worldwide Plaza was completed in 1989, and a temporary certificate of occupancy was issued that February. The Worldwide Cinemas multiplex beneath the complex opened in June 1989, and Cravath, Swaine & Moore moved into One Worldwide Plaza that September. Ogilvy's offices were completed behind schedule, costing the developers several million dollars. By then, Zeckendorf was developing several additional structures along the midtown section of Eighth Avenue, including two buildings directly next to Worldwide Plaza. Soon after the complex opened, Lifetime Cable Network also leased space at One Worldwide Plaza, as did electronics company Philips. The residences within the complex were not fully sold until 1993, and a quarter of the retail space was still empty in 1996.

Although the offices were fully occupied in the mid-1990s, the office space was not as profitable as Zeckendorf had originally projected. Three of One Worldwide Plaza's largest tenants had only agreed to rent space in exchange for equity, while other tenants such as PolyGram, Microsoft, and Roberts & Holland paid less rent per square foot compared to other Midtown buildings. In addition, Deutsche Bank held a $600 million mortgage loan on Worldwide Plaza. In the wake of Black Monday, the developers were barely able to make mortgage payments as long as the building's original tenants continued to pay rent.

By 1996, Deutsche Bank was looking to sell its mortgage. Zeckendorf's syndicate wished to find a partner to help buy the mortgage from Deutsche Bank, with little success. At the time, One Worldwide Plaza was fully occupied by several large tenants with long leases, but the average rent for office space had decreased about one-third since 1990. That October, the Blackstone Group bought the mortgage from Deutsche Bank for $300 million. Blackstone extended PolyGram's and Ayer's leases. Ogilvy had decided to relocate, though other companies quickly expressed interest in Ogilvy's vacant space. In October 1998, Equity Office Properties agreed to acquire the complex for about $310 million, and it also agreed to assume the $268.1 million in debt on the property. As part of a pilot program, Captivate Network installed electronic screens in One Worldwide Plaza's elevators, and the majority of the building's elevators had these screens by late 1999.

=== 2000s and early 2010s ===
The administration of mayor Rudy Giuliani sued the owners of Worldwide Plaza and two other buildings in 2000, alleging that these buildings' privately owned public spaces violated city laws. At Worldwide Plaza, two restaurants had illegally taken over many movable chairs and tables, which had been installed there as "public amenities". The suit was settled in mid-2002 after Equity Office applied to convert ten percent of the plaza's space into a private dining area for the complex's restaurants. Meanwhile, the Loews Cineplex at Worldwide Plaza closed in early 2001 after its operator went bankrupt. The former multiplex temporarily served as office space for accounting firm Deloitte later that year after that firm's offices were destroyed in the September 11 attacks. The multiplex then became an Off-Broadway venue, Dodger Stages (now New World Stages), in 2004.

In February 2007, after a bidding war with Vornado Realty Trust, Blackstone acquired Equity Office's portfolio, including One Worldwide Plaza and seven other buildings. The firm immediately resold the structures to Harry B. Macklowe as part of a $7 billion transaction; One Worldwide Plaza alone was worth $1.7 billion. Macklowe took out a $7.6 billion loan to fund the acquisitions, which was to come due within twelve months. Macklowe personally pledged $1 billion, as well as interests in twelve other properties, as a guarantee. By February 2008, the Macklowe Organization had no way to refinance the debt from the previous year. As such, Macklowe surrendered One Worldwide Plaza to his lender, Deutsche Bank. After selling Macklowe's other buildings, Deutsche Bank announced in June 2009 that it would sell One Worldwide Plaza. The next month, Deutsche Bank agreed to sell the building for $600 million to George Comfort and Sons. One Worldwide Plaza was only 46 percent occupied at the time, and the building still had a 40 percent vacancy rate at the end of the year.

Television station WNET leased space at One Worldwide Plaza in 2010. Japanese investment bank Nomura agreed to lease around 900,000 square feet (84,000 m^{2}) in 2011, bringing the building to 95 percent occupancy. The bank beat out law firm Wilmer Hale, which had also been interested in the space. George Comfort & Sons put the building up for sale in August 2012, reportedly hoping for a $1.7 billion valuation, almost triple what the company had paid just three years prior. By October 2012, bids for the building only reached around $1.5 billion. Potential buyers were reportedly worried about the building's tenants including Nomura, which had recently had its credit rating downgraded by Moody's Investors Service, and Cravath, after the law firm Dewey & LeBoeuf had declared bankruptcy earlier that year. Deutsche Bank provided a $710 million mortgage on the property in February 2013.

=== American Realty Capital ownership ===
==== 2010s ====
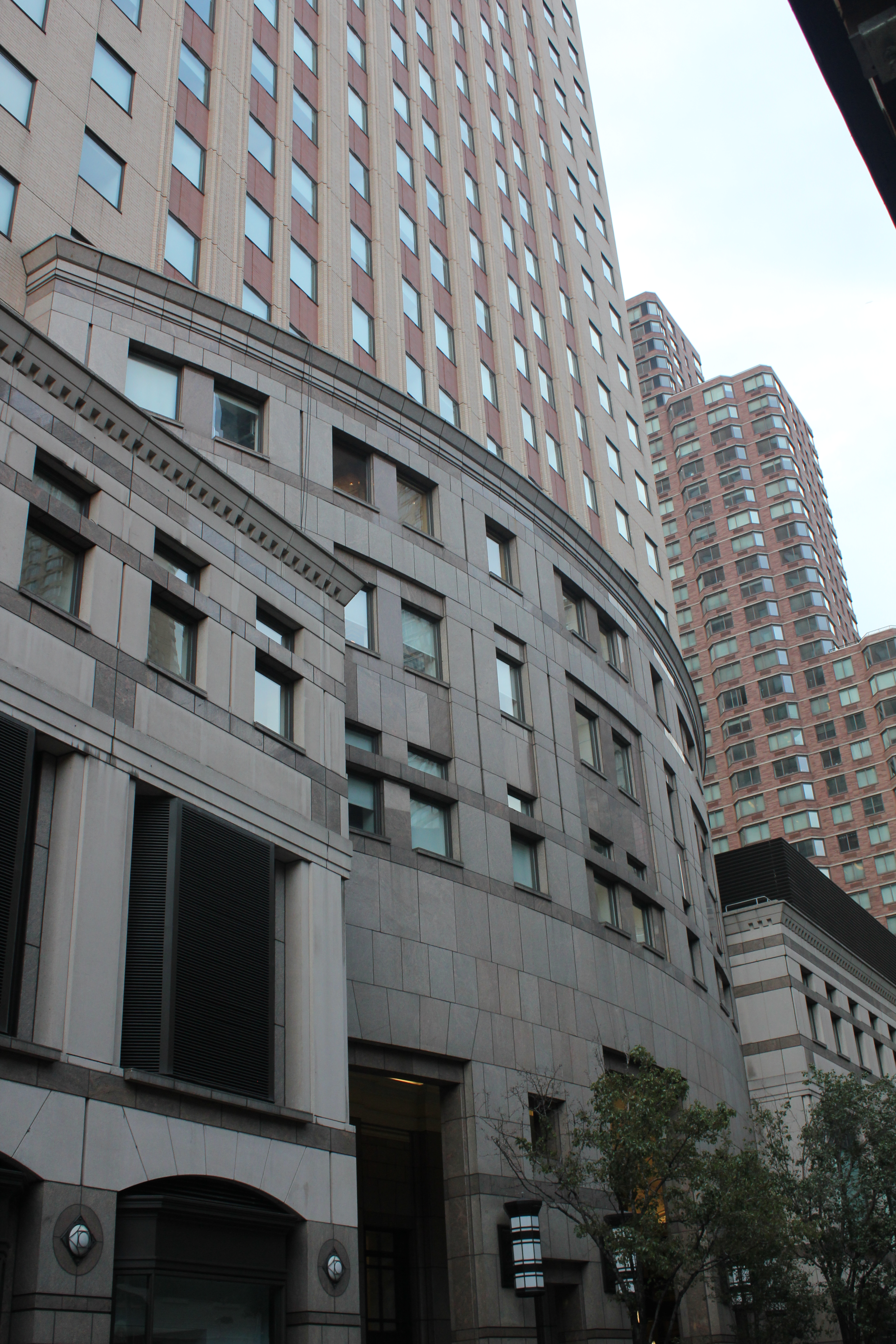
The base of the building, seen in 2021

American Realty Capital New York Recovery REIT, one of several companies owned by New York real estate mogul Nicholas Schorsch, acquired a 48.9 percent interest in the property for $220 million in November 2013, as well as the rights to buy the remaining 51.1%. The move came several months after Scott Rechler's RXR Realty had attempted to purchase the building for $1.25 billion. RXR sued American Realty Capital in an attempt to prevent the latter from acquiring ownership of the building. RXR continued its lawsuit even after American Realty Capital had bought the building. During the 2010s, Cravath, Swaine & Moore and Nomura Securities each continued to occupy roughly 700,000 square feet (65,000 m^{2}). M. Shanken Communications (owner of Wine Spectator) and CBS-TV both leased space in 2014, followed the next year by Howard J. Rubenstein's Rubenstein Associates and Prometheus Global Media. These transactions brought the building to full occupancy.

American Realty Capital placed One Worldwide Plaza for sale in January 2017. The firm exercised its option to purchase an additional 49.9 percent stake in June 2017 for $277 million, bringing the company's ownership to 98.8%. While the company had initially hoped to sell its entire stake in the building, bidders were discouraged by the property's existing $870 million mortgage, and foreign entities had decreased their investment in New York real estate. American Realty Capital opted to sell only a non-controlling stake in the building and pursue a refinancing. That September, RXR Realty and SL Green Realty agreed to purchase a 48.7 percent stake in One Worldwide Plaza, valuing the building at $1.73 billion. Following the acquisition, American Realty Capital owned 50.1 percent of the building's equity and George Comfort & Sons maintained a 1.2 percent stake. At the time, the tenants included Nomura Holdings; Cravath, Swaine and Moore; CBS; and WebMD.

Goldman Sachs agreed to provide a $1.2 billion loan to refinance the property following the acquisition. The commercial mortgage-backed security (CMBS) loan closed on October 17 and was one of the largest CMBS loans on a New York office building since the 2008 financial crisis. Shortly after origination, Goldman Sachs syndicated 25 percent of the loan to Deutsche Bank. The loan consisted of $940 million in senior debt and a $260 million junior loan. At the time, an appraisal valued the property at $1.74 billion since the building was 98.4 percent occupied and generating net cash flows of over $85 million a year. In November 2019, West Monroe Partners leased one floor.

==== 2020s to present ====
By 2023, Nomura sought to downsize its space at One Worldwide Plaza, while Cravath, Swaine & Moore planned to relocate. These two tenants collectively occupied 70 percent of the building, prompting concerns that a $940 million loan on the Worldwide Plaza complex could not be paid off. By January 2024, One Worldwide Plaza was valued at $1.2 billion, a one-third decrease from its 2018 valuation. The $940 million senior loan on the building was nearly sent to special servicing in October 2024 after the loan was placed on a lender watchlist due to lower-than-expected cash flow. The loan was restructured in early 2025, avoiding the need for special servicing. In addition, there was a dispute regarding $90 million that had been placed in a reserve account when RXR and SL Green bought a minority stake in the building. In 2025, a state judge ruled that American Realty Capital could keep the money and use the funds to attract tenants.

The building was appraised at $345 million, or 20% of its 2018 value, by August 2025, and the building's mortgage lenders were at risk of losing $488 million as a result. Occupancy rates had dropped to 63% by then, and WNET also announced plans to move out that year. Extell Development bought the building's $190 million mezzanine loan in November 2025, at which point the building's outstanding debt of $940 million was about to be sold at a foreclosure auction. After RXR and SL Green raised objections, a judge temporarily delayed the sale in January 2026 but later discarded RXR and SL Green's objection. Goldman Sachs and Deutsche Bank initiated foreclosure proceedings that February.

== Reception ==
When One Worldwide Plaza was announced, New York Times architecture critic Paul Goldberger criticized the cheapness of the building's materials, including the use of brick and the lack of granite, as well as the large massing of the tower and the small size of the driveway. He also noted the building's inspiration from the New York Life Building and Crown Building. Nonetheless, Goldberger wrote: "In general, this is the sort of plan the West Side of midtown Manhattan has been waiting for."

Following Worldwide Plaza's completion, Goldberger declared that the project had "turned one of the harshest blocks of midtown Manhattan into a glittering island of corporate luxury." He did describe One Worldwide Plaza's lower stories as resembling "stone wallpaper" because the cladding was so thin. Herbert Muschamp, also of the Times, regarded the building as one of the city's "Art Deco retreads". Jonathan Yardley of The Washington Post wrote: "Worldwide within its single city block thus epitomizes the transformation from commercial to residential, and it does so in buildings of singular handsomeness and distinction." The architect Robert A. M. Stern described One Worldwide Plaza as "the first office building of any importance to be built west of Eighth Avenue" since 330 West 42nd Street was completed in 1931. Ylonda Gault of Crain's New York wrote that One Worldwide Plaza's completion had "catapulted Mr. Childs to celebrity status in architect circles".

Conversely, Daniel Bluestone wrote for Design Book Review in 1992: "For all of its massive display of urbanity, the recoil of the development from its neighborhood is striking." Nicolai Ouroussoff described One Worldwide Plaza as having a "pointless circular arcade" and said that, like the Hearst Tower several blocks north, the building had a "strained relationship to the streets below". Brendan Gill, writing for The New Yorker in 1990, criticized the project as having "cool reasonableness", which he saw as "a defect that its designers and builders must have seen as a virtue". Gill also disliked the fact that the complex's largest structure (One Worldwide Plaza) was on Eighth Avenue rather than the middle of the block, and he believed the classical detailing to be excessive. Eric Nash wrote in 2005 that the building "lacks Rockefeller Center's sweetly naive spirit, yet still manages to be a distinctive presence on the midtown skyline".

Worldwide Plaza's construction was documented in a five-episode PBS miniseries. In addition, Karl Sabbagh wrote the book Skyscraper: The Making of a Building to complement the PBS miniseries. Goldberger wrote that the series was focused largely on the process of actually constructing Worldwide Plaza, rather than "the majesty and ambition of the American skyscraper", as Childs had intended for One Worldwide Plaza to be.

== See also ==
- List of tallest buildings in New York City
- List of tallest buildings in the United States
