= PlayTape =

Magnetic tape recording format for audio recording and playback

- Media type: Magnetic tape cartridge endless loop
- Encoding: Mono analog signal
- Capacity: Typically 8 to 24 minutes of audio per program
- Read mechanism: stereo tape head
- Write mechanism: prerecorded only
- Usage: portable and mobile audio playback devices
- Released: 1966; 60 years ago

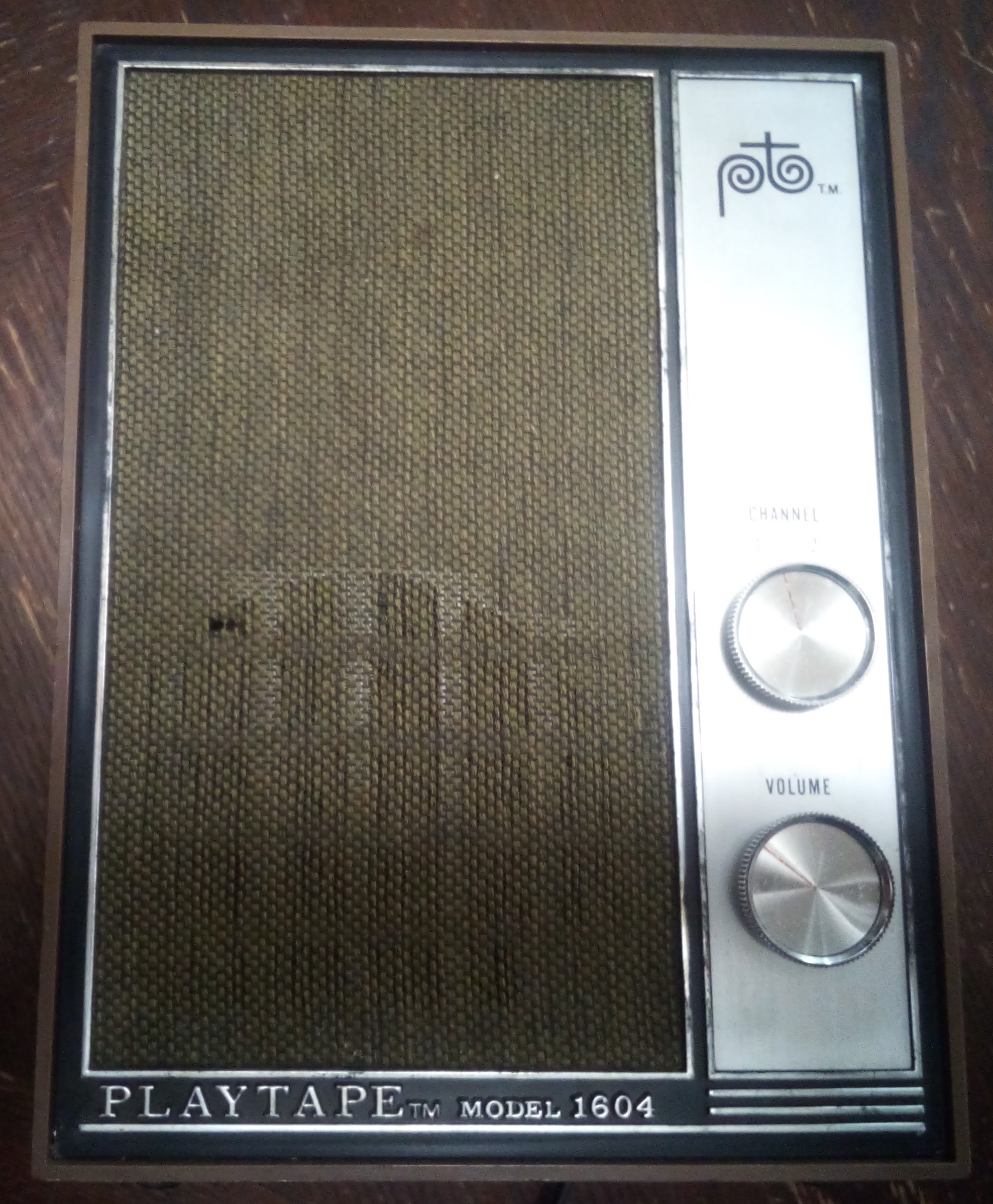
Model 1604

PlayTape is an 1/8 inch (3.2 mm) analog magnetic tape format which runs at 3¾ i.p.s., has a frequency range of 50 Hz to 8kHz, "the same as most AM radios or TV sets" of the day, approximately the same track widths and spacing as standard 4-track systems, and which featured monaural playback. Introduced in 1966 by Frank Stanton, it is a two-track system, and was launched to compete with existing 4-track cartridge technology. The tape cartridges play anywhere from eight to 24 minutes, and are continuous. Because of its portability, PlayTape was an almost instant success, and over 3,000 artists had published in this format by 1968. White cases usually meant about eight songs were on the tape.

== Introducing PlayTape ==
When PlayTape was launched, vinyl records reigned supreme, and Earl Muntz's Stereo-Pak, based on the broadcast "Fidelipac" cartridge system, was also a popular sound delivery system. His car players were offered with stereo sound. Although in production, Bill Lear's 8-track tape and Philips' cassette tape systems had not yet achieved their market potential. Moreover, neither Lear or Muntz was offering a portable player, though Muntz eventually did sell one, while portable cassette players were available from the outset.

While PlayTape found some success in reaching the youth audience, it was not as successful in targeting the business market. Stanton marketed his device as a dictation machine, but he was unable to persuade businesses to adopt his creation. Problems with player quality limited sales and, ultimately, the introduction of home and portable players by the 4-track, 8-track, and cassette manufacturers led to the demise of PlayTape.

== Automobile players ==
Only a handful of small compact players, and a few very rare car players, were sold on the open market. In the United States, Volkswagen was the only manufacturer to offer a PlayTape player as optional equipment. They are collector's items today.

Volkswagen saw a market opportunity in the U.S. for automotive audio players in 1968. Frank Stanton, president of PlayTape, announced that Motorola would manufacture an automotive player in OEM and after-market models for Volkswagen. The "Sapphire I" OEM model was designed for in-dash installation, and included an AM radio. The "Sapphire II" after-market version omitted the radio, and was designed to hang from the dashboard. The price for either unit was said to be about US $40, (today US $370).

Stanton also claimed that VW dealers would carry about 250 PlayTape titles for sale, and that some Volkswagen dealers would also sell the full line of PlayTape home and portable players. "We feel that Volkswagen salesmen will be able to interest the purchaser of a Sapphire I player in a complementary model for his home," Stanton said.

== Mail Call ==
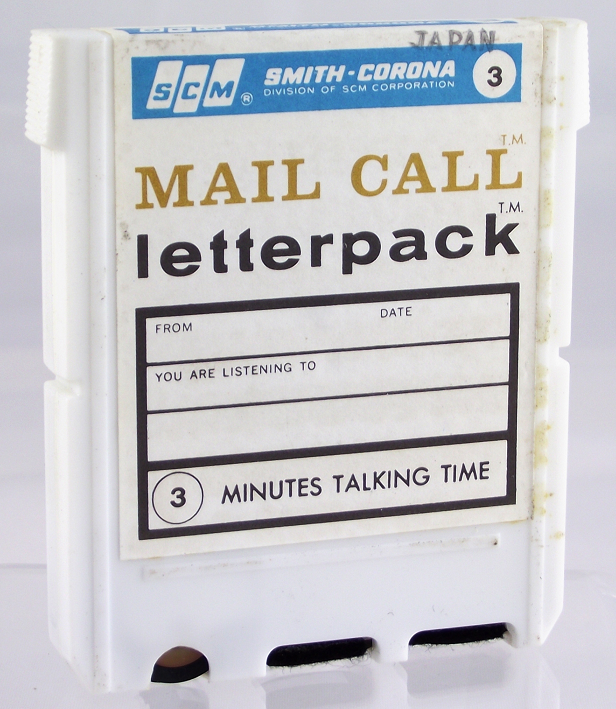
Smith-Corona Mail Call Letterpack

In 1967, Smith Corona (SCM) used the PlayTape cartridge format for the Mail Call, a device which contained the PlayTape drive. Its design resembled a telephone and used blank tape PlayTape cartridges, offered with capacities of 3, 6 and 10 minutes of recording time, to be sent as voice letters with inexpensive shipping cost. The ends of the tape loop were fixed by an adhesive tape with a conductive top to prevent overwriting the same recording.

== HIPAC ==
HiPac was a successor of the PlayTape cartridge, with some changes introduced in Japan in 1971 and disappearing soon afterwards. The HiPac had a small comeback in the mid-1970s, in children's toys for education.

== See also ==
- 8-track cartridge
- HiPac
- Stereo-Pak
- Album era
- Timeline of audio formats
- Sound recording and reproduction
- Birotron
