= George Eash =

American inventor

George H. Eash (May 11, 1911 – July 6, 1980) was an American inventor of several magnetic tape audio cartridges having a single tape reel. In 1950s he worked next desk to Bernard Cousino, who invented the endless tape loop, using it at first on an open reel. Eash created further cartridges using this tape loop like the Fidelipac, also known as the "NAB cartridge" or "cart" and used in radio & TV broadcasting, and as a consultant of Earl "Madman" Muntz the 4-Track cartridge, known as the Muntz Stereo-Pak or CARtridge. With the Lear 8-Track cartridge Eash's patent plea failed.

== Career ==
Eash was born in Pennsylvania to Joe and Lydia Eash. Working for a promotion company, in 1952 Eash rented a desk in the office of Bernhard Cousino's Electronic Workshop, Toledo (Ohio).

In 1954 Eash finished a handmade 1200 ft continuous loop tape prototype cartridge with tape transport driven by the rubber pinch roller of the capstan, for RCA Victor and filed it for patent. The next day, 23 December 1954 his employer Paulsen died. The interim management canceled Eashs project.

In 1957 the 1954 filed patent was granted and Eash was working for Viking Corporation of Minneapolis. The result was the "35 Series", a 600 ft tape cartridge operating on 7.5 IPS.

In 1961 Eash moved to Van Nuys, a northern suburb of Los Angeles, where Earl "Madman" Muntz operated some of his business. Eash was a consultant of Muntz and created based on his Fidelipac the Muntz Stereo-Pak (also known as the 4-Track cartridge or CARtridge) and the player device for it.

In 1967 Eash was working for TelePro Industries and failed in a patent plea at Wichita, Kansas court. The judge stated Eash's patent filed in 1954 was an obvious modification of the Mohawk Message Repeater. Inside the Mohawk cartridge, the tape revolves on a fixed hub. Eash used a free rotating reel in his cartridge. William "Bill" Lear benefited from this judgement by getting a clear patent situation for this 8-Track cartridge system.

Eash died in Provo, Utah, aged 68, of an intestinal ailment. He left a widow, son, and daughter.
