= Bernard Cousino =

American audio technology inventor (1902–1994)

Bernard August Cousino (August 1, 1902 – December 29, 1994) was an American audio technology inventor. He invented an endless loop tape cartridge design in 1952, known as the Audio Vendor, under U.S. Patent 2804401A. The tape is pulled from the inside of a loose tape roll making it spin to wind the returning tape onto the roll again. Initially, this mechanism was mounted on a reel to reel tape recorder. Later Cousino developed a plastic housing to be hung on some tape recorders. At first, the magnetic coating was wound facing the inside of the reel. This cartridge was marketed by John Herbert Orr as the Orrtronic Tapette. Newer cartridges had the magnetic coating wound facing outside of the reel, which required a special recorder to operate it, but offered comfortable, simple insertion of the cartridge without threading the tape. These more compact cartridges do not require any bottom spare for the tape head assembly. That would inspire George Eash to make the Fidelipac tape cartridge, which itself inspired the Stereo-Pak tape cartridge.

Another Cousino patented invention was a low-friction, graphite coated back side of the audio tape, suppressing crumpling when pulling the endless tape from the inner reel. The coating was also used on 8-Track tape, giving a gray appearance to the back side of the tape.

Cousino died in Lee County, Florida on December 29, 1994 at the age of 92.
