= Recording format =

Format for encoding data for storage

A cylinder, head, and sector of a hard drive. The sectors are a recording container format. The digital data on the disks may be both secondary container file formats and raw digital data content formats such as digital audio or ASCII encoded text.

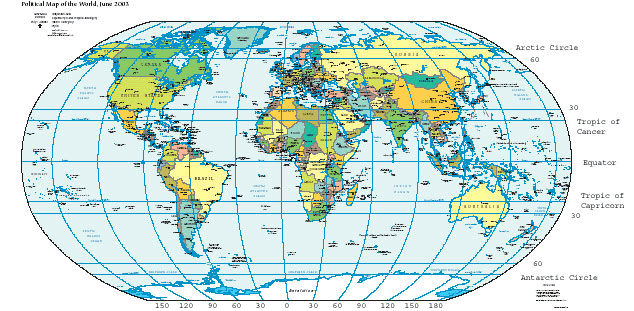
A map of Earth showing lines of latitude (horizontally) and longitude (vertically). The lines are a grid, a method for dividing and containing recorded cartographical data. The land masses and oceans are cartographical data in a raw content (pictorial graphical) format. The text is in an alphanumerical symbolic raw content format.

A recording format is a format for encoding data for storage on a storage medium. The format can be container information such as sectors on a disk, or user/audience information (content) such as analog stereo audio. Multiple levels of encoding may be achieved in one format. For example, a text encoded page may contain HTML and XML encoding, combined in a plain text file format, using either EBCDIC or ASCII character encoding, on a UDF digitally formatted disk.

In electronic media, the primary format is the encoding that requires hardware to interpret (decode) data; while secondary encoding is interpreted by secondary signal processing methods, usually computer software.

== Recording container formats ==
A container format is a system for dividing physical storage space or virtual space for data. Data space can be divided evenly by a system of measurement, or divided unevenly with meta data. A grid may divide physical or virtual space with physical or virtual (dividers) borders, evenly or unevenly. Just as a physical container (such as a file cabinet) is divided by physical borders (such as drawers and file folders), data space is divided by virtual borders. Meta data such as a unit of measurement, address, or meta tags act as virtual borders in a container format. A template may be considered an abstract format for containing a solution as well as the content itself.

- Systems of measurement
  - Metric system
  - Geographic coordinate system
  - Page grid
- Film formats
- Audio data format
- Video tape format
- Disk format
- File format
- Meta data
  - Text formatting
  - Template
  - Data structure

== Raw content formats ==
A raw content format is a system of converting data to displayable information. Raw content formats may either be recorded in secondary signal processing methods such as a software container format (e.g. digital audio, digital video) or recorded in the primary format. A primary raw content format may be directly observable (e.g. image, sound, motion, smell, sensation) or physical data which only requires hardware to display it, such as a phonographic needle and diaphragm or a projector lamp and magnifying glass.

== Sources ==
- Havelock, David, ed. (2008). Handbook of Signal Processing in Acoustics, Volume 1. Springer. ISBN 978-0387776989.
- Whitaker, Jerry C., ed. (1996). The Electronics Handbook. CRC-Press. ISBN 9780849383458.
