= Frank Stanton (entrepreneur) =

American entrepreneur and investor

- Born: May 9, 1921
- Died: May 5, 1999 (aged 77); Water Mill, New York

Frank Stanton (May 9, 1921 - May 5, 1999) was an entrepreneur and investor, and was responsible for two pioneering (though ultimately unsuccessful) consumer audio and video systems.

== Biography ==
His companies traded surplus goods around the world after World War II, and later imported German cars into the United States. In the 1960s, he developed the PlayTape audio cartridge, an early cassette system and, in the 1970s, the Cartrivision VCR system. In later years, he was involved in the real estate business, notably the Crowne Plaza Times Square Manhattan and One Worldwide Plaza in New York.

He died in 1999 from complications of Parkinson's disease.
