= Stereo-Pak =

Magnetic tape-based format for audio

- Media type: Magnetic tape cartridge
- Encoding: Analog signal
- Read mechanism: Tape head
- Write mechanism: Magnetic recording head
- Developed by: Earl Muntz
- Usage: Car audio playback
- Released: 1962; 63 years ago

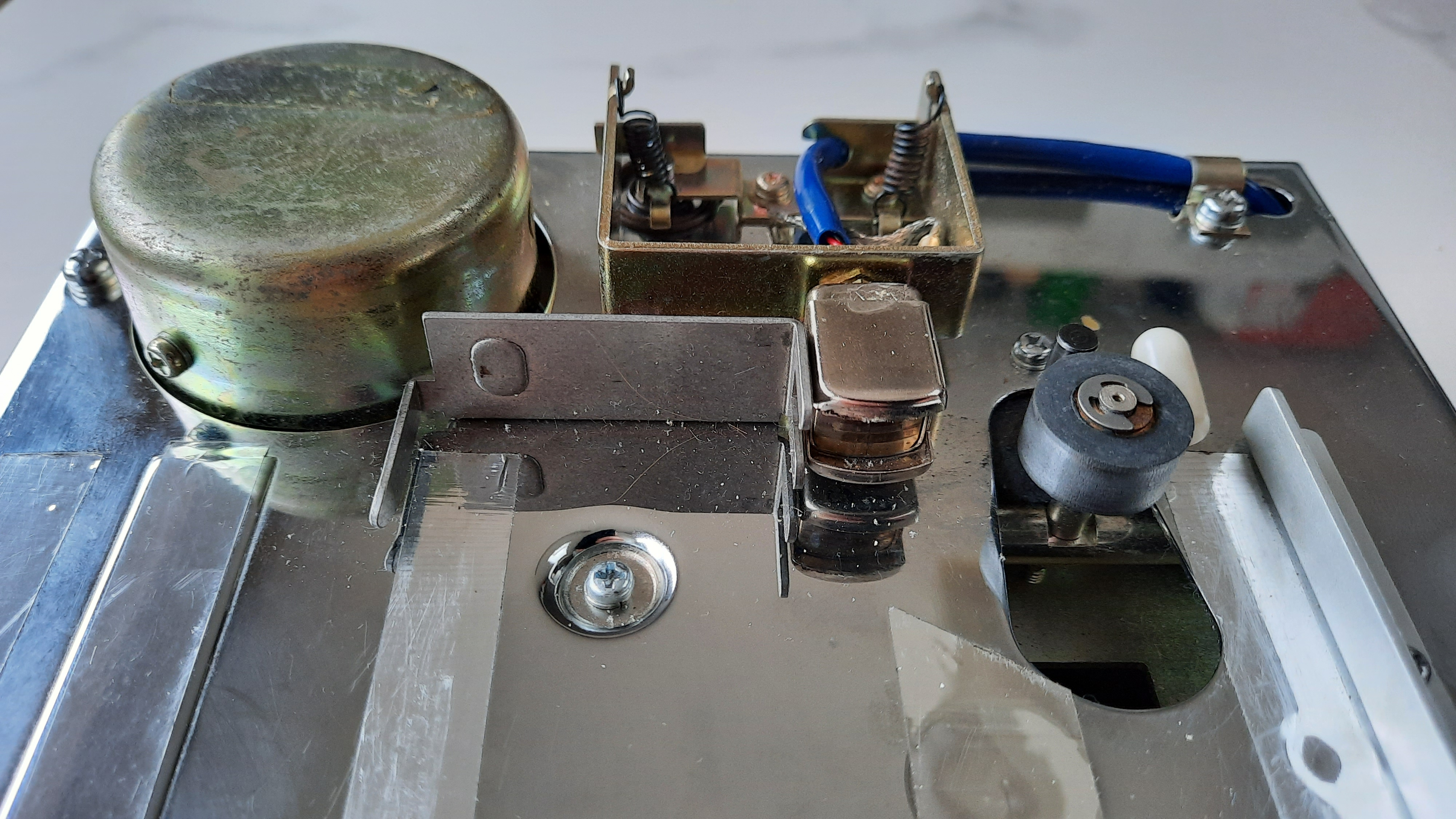
Stereo-Pak player close up

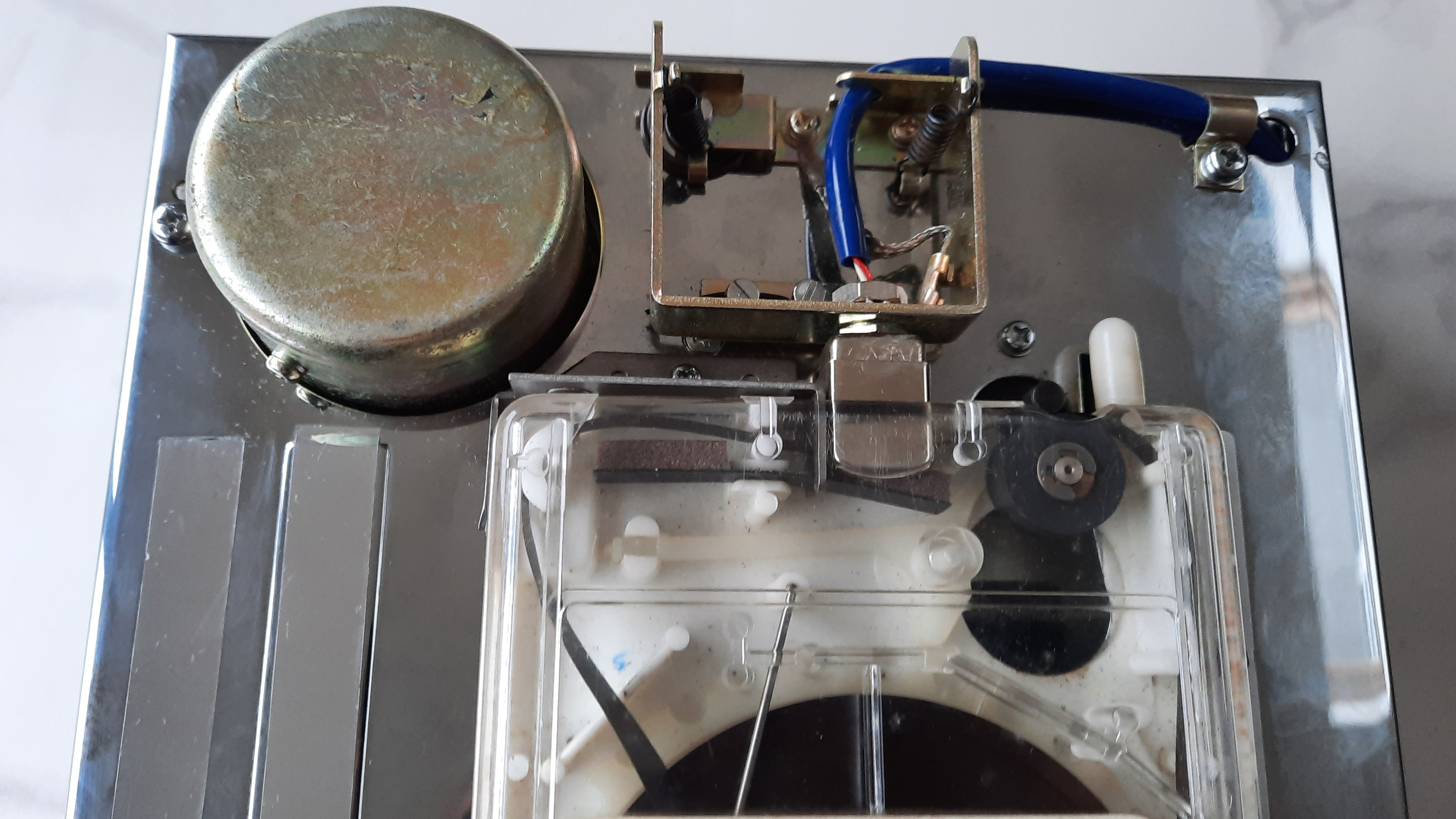
Stereo-Pak player with cartridge

The Muntz Stereo-Pak, commonly known as the 4-track cartridge, is a magnetic tape sound recording cartridge technology.

The Stereo-Pak cartridge was inspired by the Fidelipac 2-track monaural (audio & cue tracks, later 3-track for stereo) tape cartridge system invented by George Eash in 1954 and used by radio broadcasters for commercials and jingles in 1959. The Stereo-Pak was adapted from the Fidelipac cartridge design by Earl "Madman" Muntz in 1962, in partnership with Eash, as a way to play pre-recorded tapes in cars.

The tape is arranged in an infinite loop that traverses a central hub and crosses a tape head, usually under a pressure pad to assure proper tape contact. The tape is pulled by tension, and spooling is aided by a lubricant, usually graphite.

== History ==
The endless loop tape cartridge was designed in 1952 by Bernard Cousino of Toledo, Ohio.

Previously, music in the car had been restricted mostly to radios. Records, due to their methods of operation and size, were not practical for use in a car, although several companies tried to market automobile record players such as the Highway Hi-Fi and the Auto-Com flexidisc.

Entrepreneur Earl "Madman" Muntz of Los Angeles, California, saw a potential in Fidelipac broadcast carts for an automobile music tape system, and in 1962 introduced his "Stereo-Pak 4-Track Stereo Tape Cartridge System" and pre-recorded tapes, initially in California and Florida. He licensed popular music albums from the major record companies and duplicated them on these 4-track cartridges, or CARtridges, as they were first advertised.

Music came in four cartridge sizes.

- AA (single) size was an inch wide by two inches long and carried the same amount of time per track (6 minutes) as one side of a 45 RPM EP.
- A-size, 4 inches wide by 5 inches long, was the most common size. The same size as the vast majority of NAB (Fidelipac) carts, it was able to carry a 3-inch reel.
- B-size, six inches wide by 7 inches long, was used infrequently for 2-LP sets and other extended programs. Able to carry a 5-inch reel.
- C-size, able to carry a full 1800-foot 7-inch reel of one-mil tape, used infrequently for extremely extended 4-LP sets.

Muntz developed and marketed a variety of mobile and stationary players and recorders for his 4-track tapes.

The B- and C-size carts would have their stereo sound split to mono and be used for background music systems all the way up to the early 1990s, when digital took over. In the last part of that period, a last-ditch effort to reduce cost came in the form of reducing the tape speed first to 1-7/8 IPS and then to 15/16 IPS, while reducing the cartridge size first back to the standard widely available A-size and then to a hybrid size between the AA (single) size and the A-size. At first, chromium high-bias tape was used to offset the loss of fidelity from the lower speed, and then, when that proved too expensive, cobalt-based tape was substituted.

After riding in Muntz's car and listening to his 4-track cartridge system, electronics and aerospace entrepreneur Bill Lear had an employee of Lear Jet Corporation create a modified derivative, resulting in the more convenient and long-playing 8-track cartridge system, which quickly supplanted and surpassed the 4-track in the market until being surpassed, itself, by the cassette tape system.

== See also ==
- PlayTape
- HiPac
- 8-track cartridge
- Album era
- Timeline of audio formats
- Sound recording and reproduction
- Birotron
