= Inch per second =

Unit of speed or velocity

The inch per second is a unit of speed or velocity. It expresses the distance in inches (in) traveled or displaced, divided by time in seconds (s). The corresponding coherent SI unit is the metre per second.

Abbreviations include in/s, ips, and less frequently, in⋅s^{−1}.

== Conversions ==
1 inch per second is:

= 0.0254 metres per second (exactly)
= 1/12 or 0.083̅ feet per second (exactly)
= 5/88 or 0.0568̅1̅ miles per hour (exactly)
= 0.09144 kilometres per hour (exactly)

Conversion to inches per second:

1 metre per second ≈ 39.370079 inches per second (approximately)
1 foot per second = 12 inches per second (exactly)
1 mile per hour = 17.6 inches per second (exactly)
1 kilometre per hour ≈ 10.936133 inches per second (approximately)

== Uses ==
In magnetic tape sound recording, magnetic tape speed is often quoted in inches per second (abbreviated "ips").

In computer mice sensitivity is also often referred to in inches per second (abbreviated as "ips").

In rotorcraft health monitoring, rotor and shaft induced vibration levels are often quoted in inches per second.
