= List of tape cartridge and cassette formats =

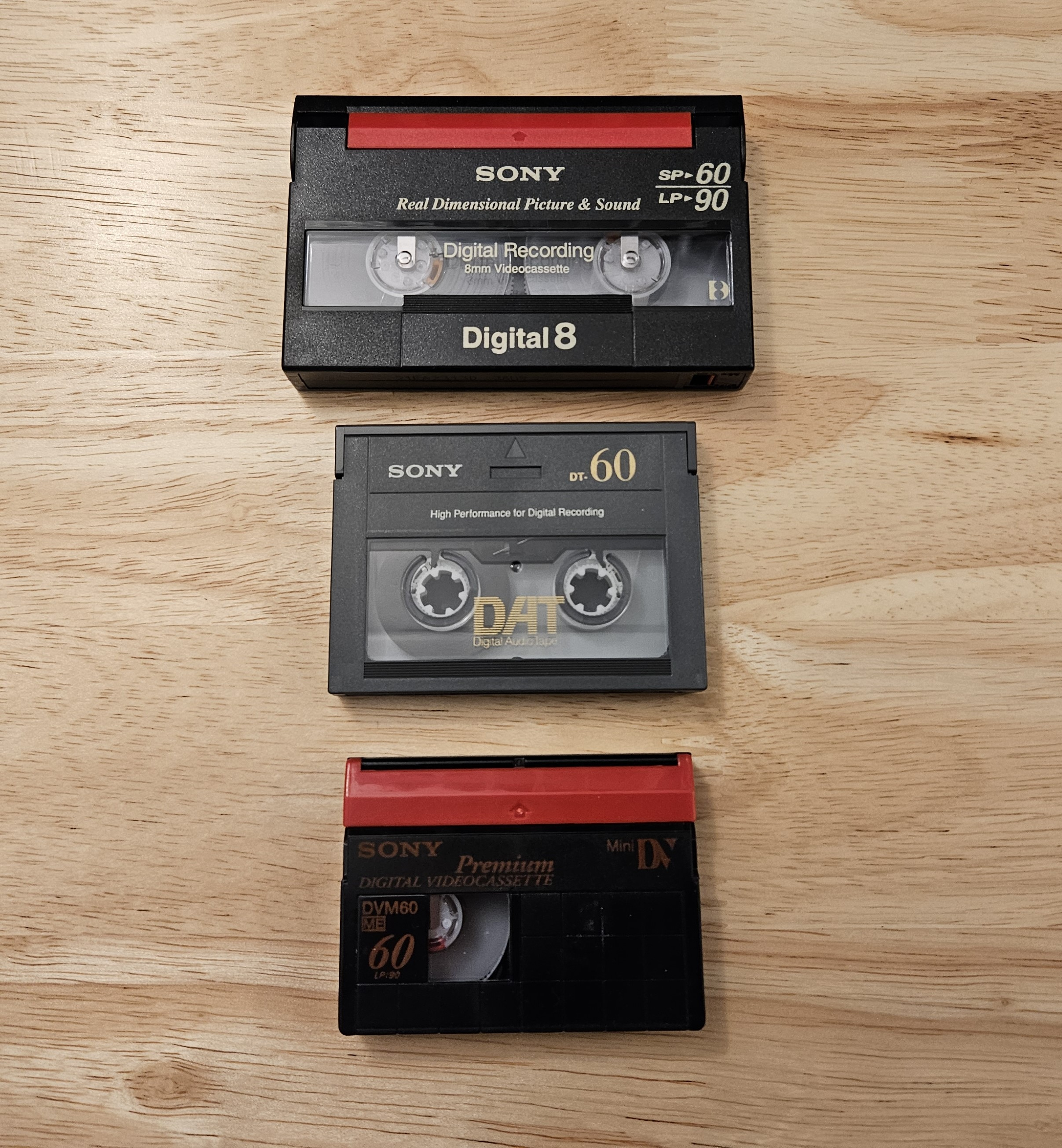
Digital8, Digital Audio Tape, and MiniDV formats

The following is a list providing an overview of all the different tape cartridge and cassette formats that use magnetic tape. Both "cassette" and "cartridge" refer to a small plastic unit containing a length of magnetic tape on at least one reel. The unit may contain a second "take-up" reel or interoperate with such a reel in an associated tape drive. At least 142 distinct types have been known to exist.

The phrase cassette tape is ambiguous in that there is no common dictionary definition so depending upon usage it has many different meanings, as for example any one the one of 106 different types of audio cassettes, video cassettes or data cassettes listed at The Museum of Obsolete Media.

The phrase cartridge tape is also ambiguous with 36 different types of audio, video or data cartridges listed at The Museum of Obsolete Media.

From time to time the terms 'tape cartridge' and 'tape cassette' are used to describe the same product. In current production are the Compact Cassette tape, the LTO tape cartridge and the IBM 3592 tape cartridge.

== Audio ==
- Analog based
  - Cassette tape, a two-spool tape cassette format for analog audio recording and playback and introduced in 1963 by Philips
  - DC-International, a format that was created by Grundig after Phillips had abandoned an earlier format that was being created alongside the Compact Cassette
  - 8-track tape, continuous loop tape cartridge system introduced in 1964
  - PlayTape, a format similar to 8-track that was created by Frank Stanton
  - HiPac, a format created by Pioneer as an alternative to 8-track to be used outside of North America
  - Mini-Cassette, a small cassette tape format developed by Phillips for dictation machines and data storage for the Philips P2000 home computer
  - Microcassette, a small cassette tape format that used the same width of magnetic tape as the Compact Cassette but in a much smaller cartridge developed by Olympus
  - Steno-Cassette, a small cassette tape format developed by Grundig for dictation machines
  - Picocassette, a cassette tape cartridge format that was half the size of the Microcassette made by JVC
  - RCA tape cartridge, a cartridge tape created by RCA and introduced in 1958 meant to take the hassle of handling unruly tapes easier
  - Elcaset, a format introduced in 1976 by Sony based on the RCA tape cartridge that was supposed to be more convenient than its predecessor
- Digital based
  - Digital Tape Format, a magnetic tape data storage format developed by Sony
  - Digital Audio Tape (DAT), a signal recording and playback medium developed by Sony and introduced in 1987
  - Digital Compact Cassette (DCC), a magnetic tape sound recording format introduced by Philips and Matsushita in late 1992 and marketed as the successor to the standard analog Compact Cassette
  - NT (cassette), a small cassette tape created by Sony that was smaller than a Picocassette only used for dictation machines but had plans to be used in music

== Video ==
- Videocassette, a cartridge containing videotape
  - Analog based tapes
    - VHS, the most successful consumer videocassette format, introduced by JVC/Matsushita
    - VHS-C, a compact VHS videocassette format for camcorders
    - Betamax, another common consumer videocassette format, introduced by Sony
    - Betacam, an industrial version of Betamax that was for professional use
    - Akai VK, a short lived videocassette format for use with video cameras
    - Cartrivision, an early videocassette format and the first to offer feature films for rental
    - Compact Video Cassette, a short lived videocassette format for use with video cameras, introduced by Funai
    - 8 mm video format, a popular videocassette format for camcorders, introduced by Sony
    - Hi8, a higher definition development of 8 mm
    - U-matic, the first videocassette format when introduced by Sony in 1971, mostly adopted in professional/industrial settings
    - V-Cord, an early videocassette format introduced by Sanyo
    - Video 2000, a 1980s videocassette format introduced by Philips and Grundig
    - Video Cassette Recording, an early videocassette format introduced by Philips, with later variants VCR-LP and Grundig's SVR
    - VX (videocassette format), a short lived videocassette format introduced by Matsushita, branded 'Quasar' in the United States
  - Digital based tapes
    - DV, a digital video tape format & codec launched to record video for both professional & amateur use
    - MicroMV, the smallest videocassette ever produced and was launched by Sony in 2001
    - Digital8, the digital version of Video8 (8 mm video) introduced by Sony
    - D-VHS, a version of VHS used to store digital video launched in 1998
    - Digital Betacam, a digital version of Betacam that delivered digital recorded video
    - Digital-S, a digital version of VHS launched by JVC in 1995 to compete with Digital Betacam

== Computer data ==
- Compact Cassette was used in various different systems
  - List of Compact Cassette tape data storage formats
- Digital Data Storage cassette (DDS)
- Data8 cassette, a videocassette derivative by Exabyte
- Digital Tape Format cassette, developed by Sony (DTF)
- Digital Data Pack cassette, a proprietary format made by Coleco, and used by the Coleco Adam (DDP)
- Digital Linear Tape cartridge (DLT)
- IBM 7340 cartridge, one of the first tape formats packaged in a cassette
- Linear Tape-Open cartridge (LTO)

== See also ==
- Digital cassettes
- Timeline of audio formats
- Tape drive, a data storage device that reads and writes data on a magnetic tape, many of which are cassette-based
