= Techmoan =

British Internet personality

- Born: Matthew Taylor; 18 January 1971 (age 55)
- Occupation: YouTuber

YouTube information
- Channel: Techmoan
- Years active: 2009–present
- Genres: Consumer tech; retrotech
- Subscribers: 1.47 million
- Views: 375.1 million
- Last updated: 13 November, 2026

Matthew "Mat" Taylor, better known by his YouTube handle Techmoan, is a British YouTuber and blogger, specialising in consumer tech reviews and retrotech documentaries about technology of historical interest.

Apart from reviews and tests, Taylor's videos often include disassembling (and repairing when possible) products and, in the case of older technology, reporting on the product's history and reception via references in publications of the time. For audio and entertainment devices this is often Billboard magazine, which at the time covered both consumer and trade electronics devices through articles and old advertisements. Bonus outro skits often feature a trio of muppet-like puppets, parodying YouTube viewer comments.

Taylor's videos have been referenced by sites such as The A.V. Club, Gizmodo, Hackaday, El Español and print publications such as Popular Mechanics and The Daily Telegraph. By ratings on Reddit, MarketWatch listed the YouTube channel 6th in its "binge-watching" top ten.

Current product reviews on miscellaneous tech items, mainly on consumer products like action and dashcams, sometimes sponsored or donated, participating in the affiliate marketing associates program of Amazon Services LLC, and a Patreon membership, are how the channel is funded.

== History ==
In 2006, Taylor started a YouTube channel called "Vectrexuk", with videos of similar tech items like installing a home cinema and controlled toasters "just to prove a point that people will watch anything on YouTube".

The channel "Techmoan" started on 31 May 2009, uploading a tour of a 2009 Piaggio MP3, taken at 480p and very basic sound quality. For additional non-tech videos, in 2015 he started another channel, called the "Youtube Pedant". In a 2016 video covering the D-VHS format, he uncovered a 1080i video of New York City filmed in 1993. This footage was uploaded separately to his "Youtube Pedant" channel where as of September 2024, it has gained 7.3 million views as well as being shared widely on sites such as Reddit and The Verge. As of November 2026, the main channel has over 1.47 million subscribers and over 375 million views. His videos often get millions of views, and his video on the Nixie watch has had more than 5 million views.

== Later documentary videos ==
Documentary videos about forgotten magnetic tape recording formats show the OMNI Entertainment System which used 8-track tape storage, the HiPac, a successor of the PlayTape and related applications of it. Other videos show some of the smallest and largest analog recording tape cartridges ever made like the Picocassette for dictation machines or Cantata 700 background music system. Further videos show other former quarter-inch-tape cartridge formats like the Sabamobil which used existing 3-inch open reels for mobile use, and the portable Sanyo Micro Pack 35, as well as the RCA tape cartridge and the Sony Elcaset with another compromise of playtime and sound quality, oddities and gimmicks on Compact Cassettes as "reinventing the reel", several ways of autoreverse, automatic multiple cassette players, endless loop cassettes, and cassette mass production technology.

Documentary on formats of vinyl recording show the Tefifon endless cartridge, or the Seeburg 1000 background music system, vertical turntables, and other audio encodings CX and dbx for noise reduction on vinyl analog recording.

Other documentaries show the mechanical Curta calculator, devices with Nixie tube displays, wire recording, and the WikiReader.

== In popular culture ==
Techmoan was referenced in a Dennis & Gnasher Unleashed strip in The Beano, with Dennis referring to Techmoan as "total Dad-Tube".

== See also ==
- Lazy Game Reviews
- The 8-Bit Guy
