= Single-hole cassette =

Unreleased audio tape format

The single-hole cassette, (from German Einloch-Kassette), was a concept of a high fidelity suitable magnetic tape cartridge or cassette from Philips for analog recordings. Tape and tape speed were identical to the Compact Cassette. It was never released to the public.

== History ==
Since 1961, the Dutch company Philips has been working on the development of a hi-fi–compatible cassette in its Vienna tape recorder factory WIRAG. The Viennese factory had experience with the development and production of dictation machines with single-hole cassettes. Based on this, the new cassette was to be created as a high quality tape system for home use. Apart from Philips itself both Grundig and other record companies affiliated with Philips, the Philips Phonographische Industrie and the Deutsche Grammophon (German Gramophone company), were involved in its development.

At the same time, a Belgian Philips team developed a two-hole cassette under the name Pocket Recorder in Eindhoven. The Philips management chose this product and put it on the market as Compact Cassette. Philips belatedly informed its partner Grundig about this decision and in return offered Grundig to participate in the development of the Pocket Recorder. Grundig was not happy about it and left the competitive system.

Based on design drawings of the compact cassette, Grundig developed the DC-International which was released in 1965. It was taken off the market only two years later.

In 1948 the development of the Protona Minifon had started, which also contained both tape rolls inside the cassette.

== Technology ==
The single-hole cassette used the tape of compact cassette 3.81 mm (= 0.15 inch) wide only at a tape speed 1 7/8 inch = 4.7625 cm per second, rounded: 4.75 cm/s. To wind the tape back into the cassette, the single-hole cassette got onto its built-in tape reel ring gear with 8-teeth for traction, which represents the single hole. The second winding roll is part of the tape device, whereby the cassette can not be removed until it has been completely rewound. The second tape reel accommodated in the device increases the space required there, but makes the cassette more compact. The drive is a more elaborate design because the first tape end has to be fed from the inserted cassette on the take-up roll in the drive.

For data backups, these properties were not disadvantageous. With a 3 1/3 × wide band, digital recording and modified traction, the concept of the single-hole cassette has seen yet another renaissance more than 35 years later, on the Linear Tape-Open (LTO).
