= Audio tape specifications =

Since the widespread adoption of reel-to-reel audio tape recording in the 1950s, audio tapes and tape cassettes have been available in many formats. This article describes the length, tape thickness and playing times of some of the most common ones.

All tape thicknesses here refer to the total tape thickness unless otherwise specified, including the base, the oxide coating and any back coating. In the United States, tape thickness is often expressed as the thickness of the base alone. However, this varies from manufacturer to manufacturer and also between tape formulations from the same manufacturer. Outside of the US, the overall thickness is more often quoted, and is the more relevant measurement when relating the thickness to the length that can be fit onto a reel or into a cassette.

== Reel-to-reel quarter-inch ==
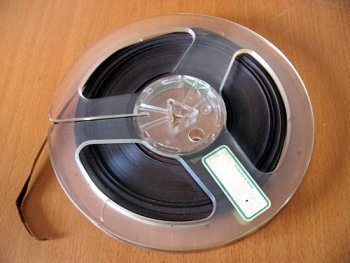
A seven-inch reel of 1/4 in (6.4 mm) tape

The tape decks of the 1950s were mainly designed to use tape 1/4 inch (0.64 cm) wide and to accept one of two reel formats:

- 10 1/2 inches (27 cm) reels, almost always with metal flanges, which fit over a hub three inches in diameter. These reels and hubs were similar to those used for wider tape formats such as 1/2 in (13 mm), 1 in (25 mm), and 2 in (51 mm) tape widths, and were principally used for studio and other professional applications. The reels were known as NAB reels and the hubs on which they were mounted as NAB hubs.
- Reels of up to 7 inches (18 cm) in diameter, most commonly with plastic flanges but metal was also used, which fit over a splined 1/4 in (6.4 mm) shaft. These reels dominated domestic applications. The most common sizes were seven, five and three inches (17.8, 12.7 and 7.6 cm) in diameter.

In each case, the shaft or hub had three splines. In machines designed to allow for vertical mounting, the upper part of the shaft or hub could commonly be rotated by 60° so the upper splines locked the reel in place (or, more recently, used a rubber stopper placed on the spindle). Some tape decks could accommodate either format by using removable hubs for the larger reel size. When in use, these hubs were locked onto the cine spindles by the same mechanism used to secure the smaller reels.

Reel capacity is affected by both the reel diameter and the reel hub diameter. The standard ten-and-a-half-inch reel has approximately twice the capacity of the seven-inch reel, which in turn has twice the capacity of the five inch. Some (not all) reels described as three inches are in fact three and a quarter inches (8.3 cm) in diameter, in order to have half the capacity of a five-inch reel.

=== Long play, double play, triple play ===
The first commonly available increase in tape length resulted from a reduction in backing thickness from 1.5 to 1.0 mil (38 to 25 μm) resulting in a total thickness reduction from 42 to 35 μm (1.7 to 1.4 mils), which allowed 3,600 ft (1,100 m), 1,800 ft (550 m), and 900 ft (270 m) tapes to fit on ten-and-a-half-, seven-, and five-inch reels respectively. These were known as long-play tapes. Manufacturers also referred to 3 3/4 inches per second (9.525 cm/s) tape speed as long-play.

A further reduction of backing to 0.5 or 0.75 mils (13 or 19 μm) and total thickness to 26 micrometres (1.0 mil) resulted in double-play tapes of 2,400 feet (730 m) on a seven-inch reel. This and thinner tapes were not commonly used on ten-and-a-half-inch reels, as the tape was too fragile for the angular momentum of the larger reels, particularly when rewinding.

Thinner tapes with thicknesses of 18 μm, fitting 3,600 feet (1,100 m) on a seven-inch reel and 1,800 feet (550 m) on a five-inch reel were known as triple-play tapes. Triple-play tape was too fragile for many tape decks to safely rewind even on a seven-inch reel, and was more commonly used on five-inch- and smaller reels. However, 3600 ft tapes on seven-inch reels were commercially available for those who wanted them.

Studio- and otherwise professional-quality 1/4 in (6.4 mm)-width tapes thinner than long-play were not commercially available in either reel format. However, some specialised applications, such as call logging, used ten-and-a-half or larger reels of double-play or thinner tape for extended recording times. These machines were extremely restricted in the reel sizes for which they were designed, and often had no rewind or fast forward facility at all, or even playback. These functions were instead performed on a dedicated machine in the event of playback being required.

In the days when long-distance telephone calls were expensive and often very low quality, three-inch or smaller reels of triple-play or even thinner tape were used for sending long recorded messages by post, most often using 1 7/8 inches per second (4.762 cm/s) tape speed. These were known as message tapes.

=== Reel size compatibility ===
Although smaller reels could be easily mounted on any machine designed for seven-inch reels, in practice, there were three limitations on using varying sizes of reel:

- Stability in rewind and fast forward modes was often optimized for a particular reel size to allow faster winding speeds. Some machines provided a switch facility to accommodate different reel sizes, others provided speed controls and relied on manual intervention, and still others attempted to sense the reel size by various methods.
- Smaller machines were built for smaller reels and could not physically mount a full-size seven-inch reel.
- Mixing reel sizes between supply and take-up spool made fast winding still more complicated, and was discouraged or prohibited by almost all manufacturers. Even mixing metal and plastic flange reels of the same size was not supported by some machines.

Mixing NAB and smaller cine spindle reels was rarely, if ever, supported, although many machines could physically mount the combination by using one hub adaptor.

== Studio tape formats ==
As well as 1/4 in (6.4 mm) tape, studio and multitrack machines use tape widths of 1/2, 1, and 2 inches (12.7, 25.4, and 50.8 mm), and at least one 3 inches (76.2 mm) machine was available for a time.

There is also a 35 mm width, but this variety is more similar to the motion picture stock of the same width. It is referred to by the recording and motion picture industries as "magfilm". It is used for recording analog sound for a motion picture, and for interlocked playback of sound with a picture reel when editing motion picture film on a flatbed editor. It has also seen use for studio audio recording and mastering, a few albums released by the Command label in the 1960s were mastered using 35 mm magfilm. It has the same sprocket holes and the thicker acetate (or polyester) base of 35 mm negative or reversal cinema stock, but instead has a magnetic oxide layer, coating the full width of the film base (as opposed to a photographic emulsion). This variety is referred to as "fullcoat magfilm". Another variant, "stripe magfilm", has only three separate oxide "tracks" on the base, with the rest of the base being clear, with the same 35 mm sprocket holes as well.

Tapes of 1/2 in (13 mm), 1 in (25 mm) and 2 in (51 mm) width are available in many professional formulations, especially but not only formulations of 35 μm thickness (the thickness known as long play when used as 1/4 inch (6.350 mm) tape). The wider tape also made it possible to produce professional quality tapes of about 25 μm thickness (the thickness known as double play in 1/4-inch applications) in 1/2-inch and wider formats.

In all tape widths, including 1/4-inch, some studio machines use one-sided platters instead of reels. As normal studio practice is not to rewind immediately after recording or playing but rather to store tape with the start end in to take advantage of the even tension produced by the tape transport, tapes from these machines were generally stored on the platters even if the machine was capable of mounting an NAB reel. Other machines used NAB or custom reels in the larger width.

The sizes of platters and their hubs vary, NAB hubs being most common, and tape lengths up to 5,000 feet (1,524 m) not uncommon.

== Compact audio cassettes ==
The tape in a compact audio cassette is nominally 1/8 inch but actually slightly wider (3.81 millimetres (0.150 in)). The small mass of the spools and mechanism generally allows thinner tape to be used than is practical with reel-to-reel.

The thickest tape normally used in cassettes is about 16-18 μm in thickness, and is used in C60 cassettes and in shorter lengths such as the C46. As the standard tape speed for a compact cassette is 1 7/8 inches per second (4.762 cm/s) and a C60 cassette records 30 minutes per side, a C60 cassette in theory holds 281 1/4 ft (85.73 m) of tape. In practice, there is some variation, for example, Maxell quotes their C60s as being 90 m (300 ft) in length.

Tape about 11 or 12 μm in thickness is used in C90 cassettes, and also for those intermediate between a C60 and a C90, for example, the C74 produced specifically for recording a standard length CD.

A cassette longer than a C90, such as a C120, must use even thinner tape at around 9 μm. Many equipment manufacturers discourage the use of these longer cassettes, partly because the tape is so fragile, and also because of the difficulty of providing optimum recording over an extended range of tape thicknesses (thinner tape is more prone to "print through" echo).

TDK marketed an even longer play cassette, which played for 90 minutes per side. Using 6 μm thick tape, the D-C180 tape was so thin, it was translucent. The size was not very popular, because only well-set-up machines could record and play it without the tape jamming. Further, the playback signal was so low that it compromised the calibration of Dolby noise reduction systems. Most users considered that the size was only suitable for speech. The size was available for many years, though only sold in relatively small numbers. A TDK D-C240 tape was proposed but never made it to the manufacturing stage.

== Microcassettes ==
Although the microcassette uses tape thinner than the C90 compact cassette (the width is the same), much of its reduced size comes from using shorter tapes at slower recording speeds. The original standard MC60 microcassette contained 43.2 m (142 ft) of tape for 30 minutes recording per side at 2.4 cm/s (about ^{15}/_{16} ips, making it half the standard speed of a compact cassette). Most recorders also provide a slower speed of 1.2 cm/s, doubling the recording time but with poor sound quality. The only other common sizes are the MC30 with half the length of slightly thicker tape, and the MC90, with 50% more tape length than the MC60, and correspondingly thinner tape.

== Tape speeds ==
In sound recording, magnetic tape speed is often quoted in inches per second (abbreviated ips) for historical reasons. Magnetic tape speeds are commonly an even fraction of 30 ips:

ips	cm/s	Typical use
120	304.8	Used by some analog instrumentation recorders and loop bin duplicators.
60	152.4	Used by some analog instrumentation recorders, as well as loop bin duplicators.
45	114.3	Used by 3M's first digital audio recorder, the "3M Digital Audio Mastering System" in 1978. Also used by both the DASH-format Sony PCM-3348HR and the Studer D827 24-bit audio recorders.
39.4	100	Used by the first AEG Magnetophon models in 1935.
30	76.2	The highest standard professional speed.
22.5	57.15	Audio tape coated on 70 mm motion picture film, necessitated by the 112.5 ft/min film speed for 24 frame/sec projection.
18	45.72	Three- or four-channel magnetic 35 mm film, used by Everest, Mercury, Command, and Reprise Records in the 1950s and 1960s.
15	38.10	The most common studio- and otherwise professional speed for reel-to-reel including multitrack recorders.
7^{1}/_{2}	19.05	The lowest professional speed, used on some single-speed studio recorders, including multitrack recorders.; The highest domestic speed.; Used on older single-speed domestic machines.; The most common speed for prerecorded reel-to-reel tapes.; Used for the NAB cart cartridge tape format for radio broadcasting.
3^{3}/_{4}	9.53	Used on later single-speed domestic machines.; The second-most-common speed for prerecorded reel-to-reel tapes.; The speed specified for the 8-track cartridge, RCA cassette, Elcaset, Sabamobil, and HiPac formats.; Used by some consumer multitrack machines using compact cassettes.; Used later as "high speed" in some dual-speed professional compact cassette tape decks, such as the Tascam 122.
2	5.08	Used for the DC-International cassette launched by Grundig in 1965 and discontinued in 1967.
1^{7}/_{8}	4.76	The standard speed for compact cassettes and HiPac; The lowest common reel-to-reel speed.; Used for reel-to-reel message tapes.; Used for message logging and similar specialized applications.
^{15}/_{16}	2.38	The standard speed for microcassettes (although specified as 2.4 cm/s, see below).; Also used for some "talking books" on compact cassette for the blind and visually impaired, issued by the Library of Congress and the RNIB (Royal National Institute for the Blind) in the UK using a proprietary 8-track cartridge.
^{15}/_{32}	1.19	The standard alternative recording speed for microcassettes.

Tape recording first became common enough for the issue of compatibility between tape deck manufacturers to become an issue in the 1950s. At this time, the most common speeds for professional recording were 30 ips and 15 ips, and some machines already supported both speeds. As the tape speed was determined by the speed of a synchronous motor driving a capstan, one way of achieving this was to switch the poles of the motor to a different configuration, halving or doubling the speed.

This system was extended to domestic tape decks, and so slower speeds, as they were adopted, tended to be exactly half the previous slowest speed. Pre-recorded tapes were mostly 7^{1}/_{2} ips, with a few at 3^{3}/_{4} ips. Message tapes transmitted by post and call logging tapes were commonly recorded at 1^{7}/_{8} ips or even ^{15}/_{16} ips. The most common reel-to-reel speed of 7^{1}/_{2} ips is approximately 19 cm/s.

Another cause of incompatibility between tape decks was the lack of standardisation of track widths and the use of alternate (rather than adjacent) stereo tracks by many manufacturers (which limited compatibility with mono equipment).

When Philips introduced the compact audio cassette, they chose to specify the reel-to-reel standard of 1^{7}/_{8} ips (approximately 4.76 cm/s), although with narrower and thinner tape. Higher speed machines using compact cassettes commonly use 3^{3}/_{4} ips.

Although the microcassette is specified to have a standard record speed of 2.4 cm/s and low speed of 1.2 cm/s, in the dictaphone application for which it was designed these speeds are in practice identical to ^{15}/_{16} ips and ^{15}/_{32} ips. Playback speed is not specified, and on many machines is continuously variable.

== See also ==
- Sound recording
