= Microcassette =

Audio cassette format

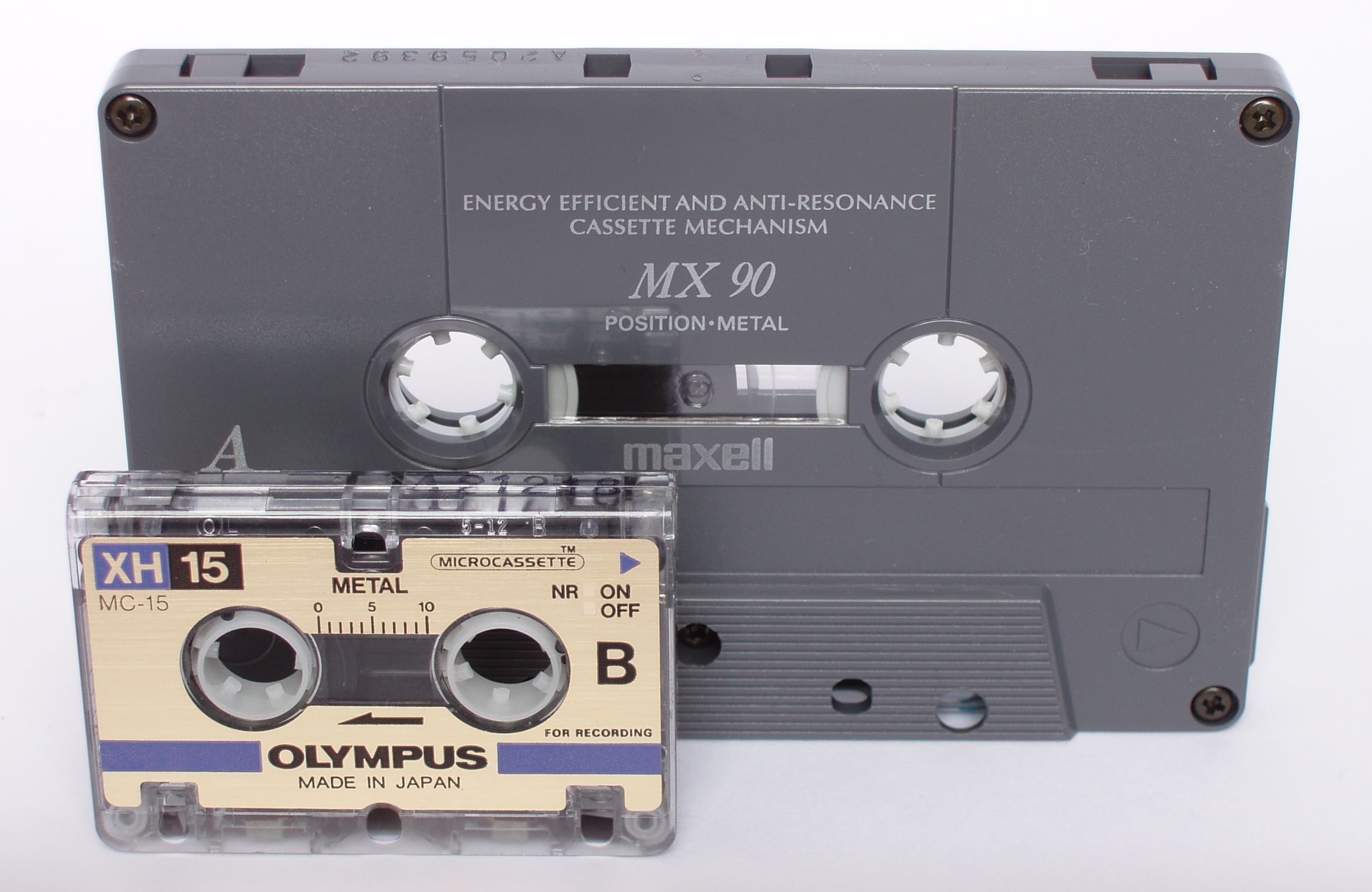
- A Microcassette is significantly smaller than a Compact Cassette
- Media type: Magnetic cassette tape
- Encoding: Analog signal
- Capacity: MC60 (30 min per side at 2.4 cm/s); MC10; MC15; MC30
- Read mechanism: Tape head
- Write mechanism: Magnetic recording head
- Developed by: Olympus
- Usage: Dictation, audio storage
- Released: 1969; 57 years ago

The Microcassette (often written generically as microcassette) is an analog audio cassette storage format, introduced by Olympus in 1969.

It has the same width of magnetic tape as the Compact Cassette but in a cassette roughly one quarter the size. By using thinner tape and half or a quarter the tape speed, microcassettes can offer comparable recording time to the compact cassette but in a smaller package.

== History ==
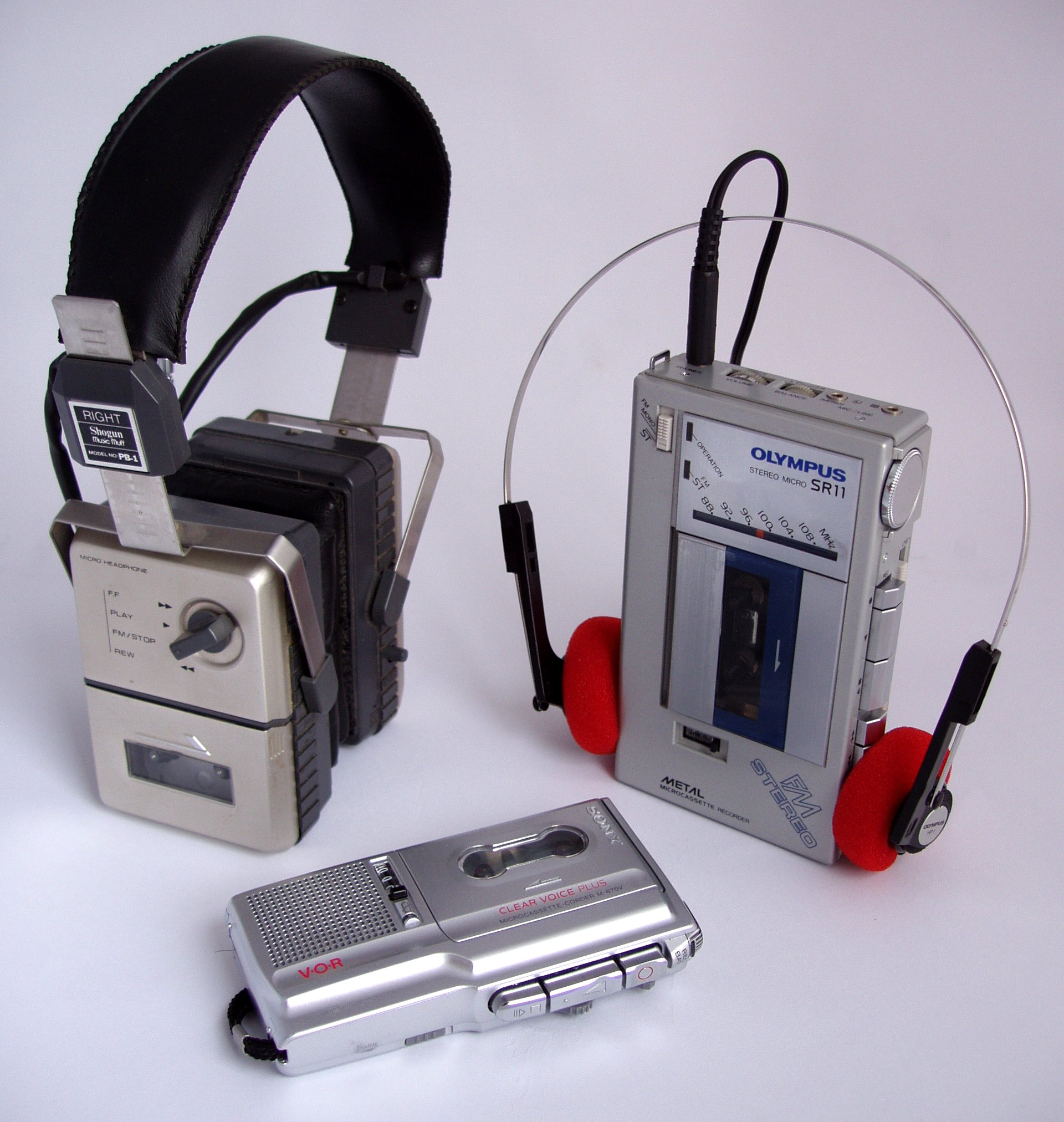
Three devices using microcassettes: Top left, stereo headphones with a cassette player built into one side. Top right, a portable cassette player and audio recorder with radio for use with headphones. Below, a miniature dictation machine mainly for business dictations, use by journalists, etc. The latter is far more widely used than the other two types, which were rather rare.

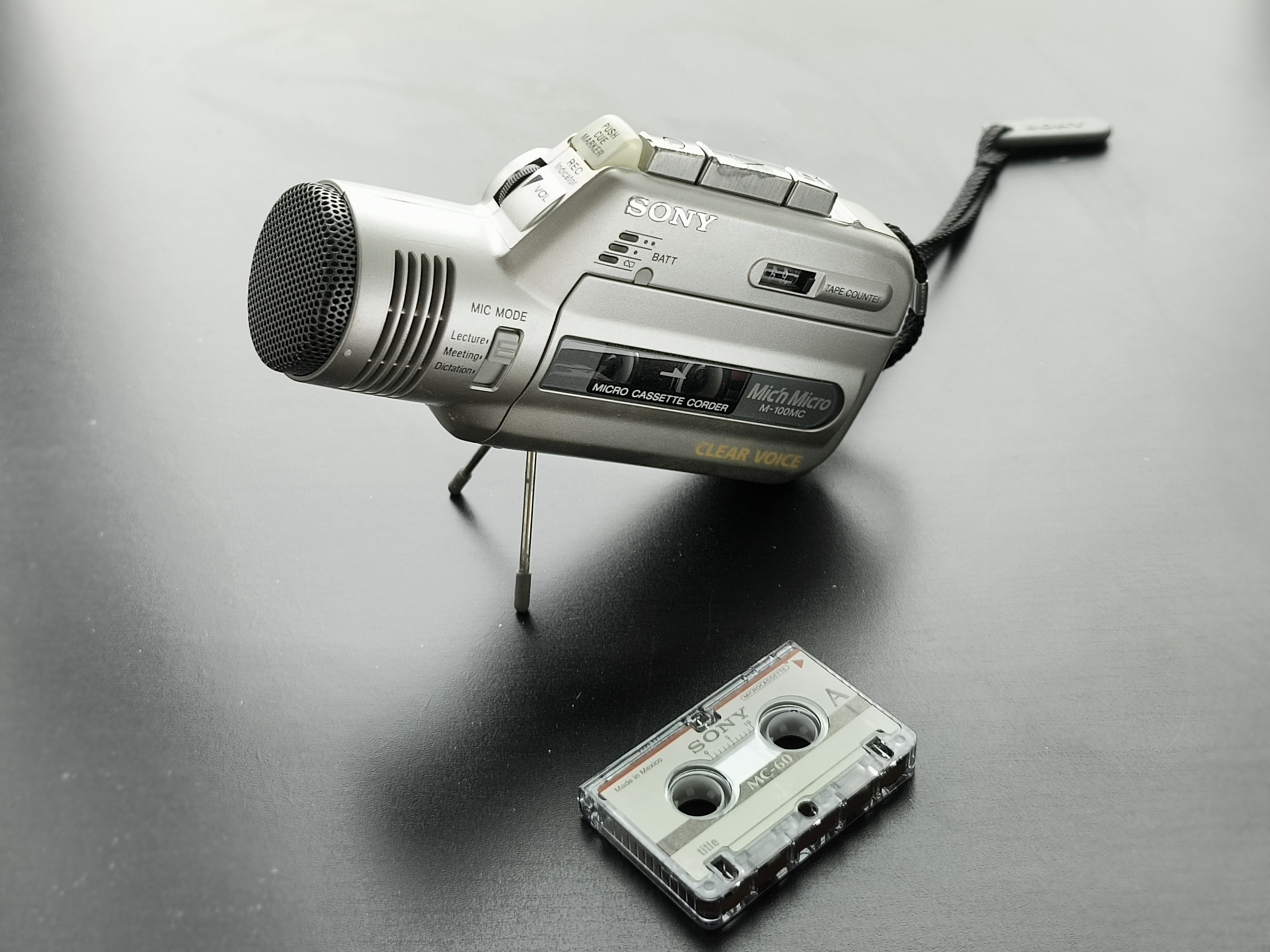
A Sony M-100MC Voice-Activated Mic n' Micro Microcassette Recorder and a microcassette

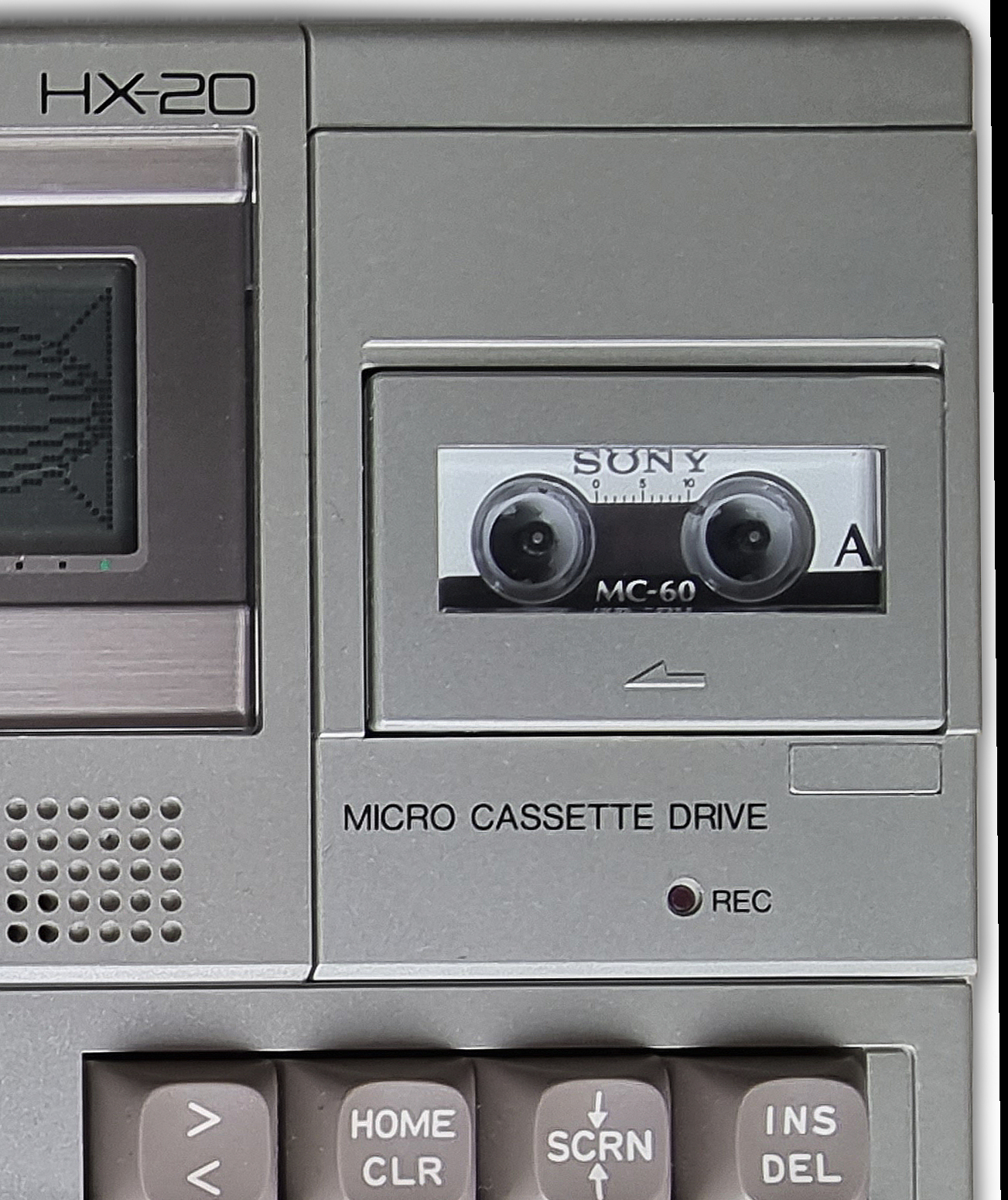
Microcassettes were sometimes also used for storing digital data. The Epson HX-20 included an integrated Microcassette-based tape drive.

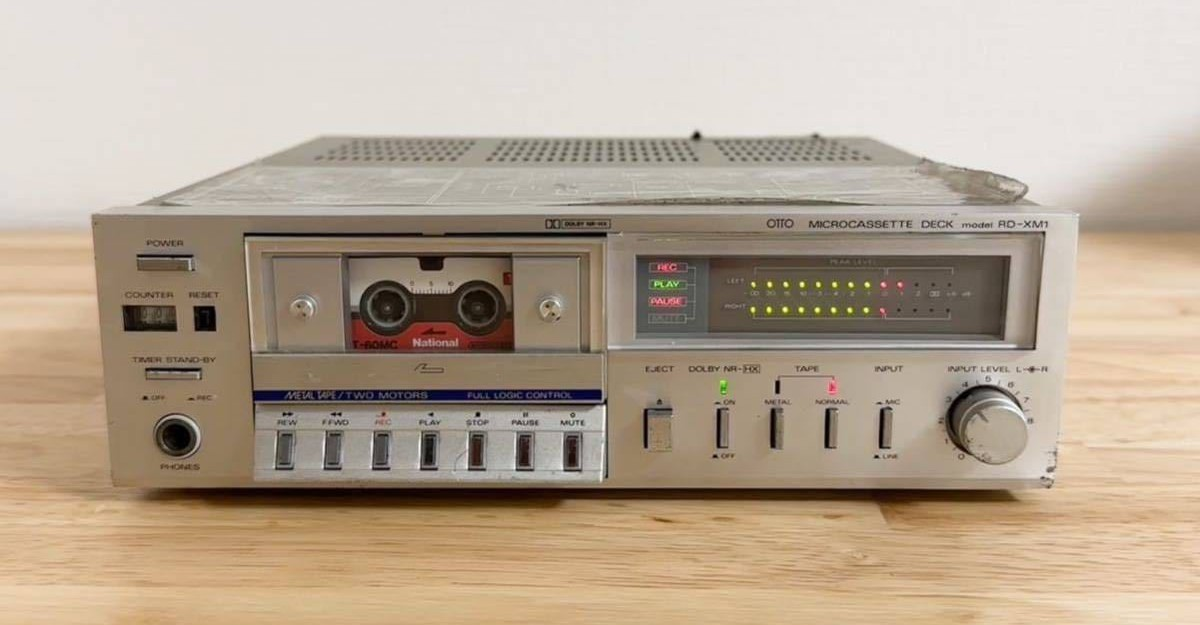
A Sanyo RD-XM1, a cassette deck for Microcassette released by Sanyo. It allowed to record and play both normal tapes and metal tapes.

Microcassettes have mostly been used for recording voice. In particular, they are commonly used in dictation machines and answering machines. Microcassettes have also been used in computer data storage and to record music. For the latter purpose, devices for recording in stereo were produced in 1982 and, for higher fidelity, microcassettes using Type IV ("metal", i.e. coated with pure metal particles rather than oxide) tape were sold. This was an attempt by Olympus to cash in on the burgeoning Walkman market; one model, the Olympus SR-11, had a built-in radio and offered a stereo tie-clip microphone as an accessory, which made the unit somewhat popular with concert-goers who wanted to record the concerts they attended without drawing attention to themselves with larger, bulkier full-sized cassette recorders.

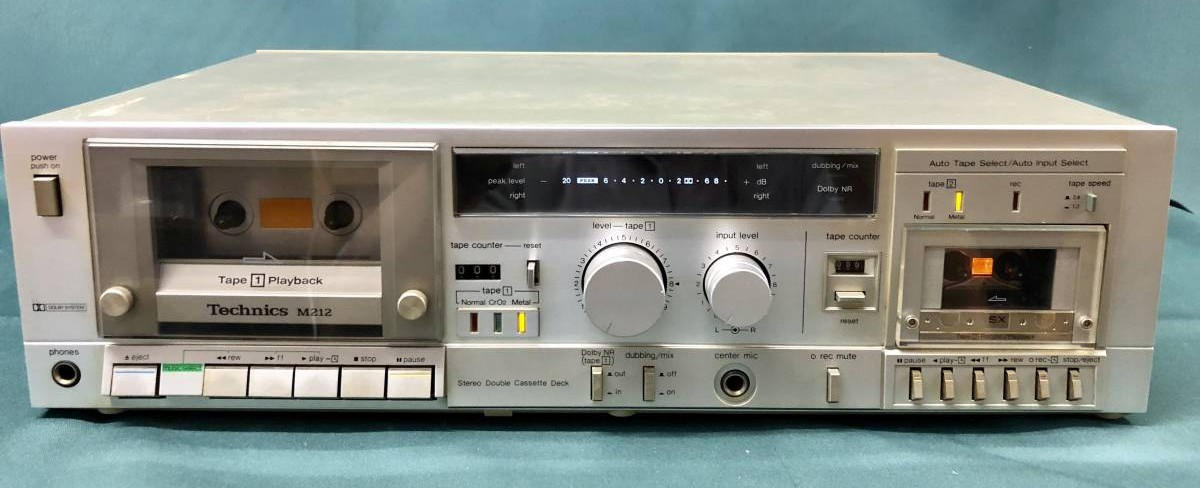
The RS-M212, a cassette deck from Technics that allowed to play both Compact Cassette and Microcassette, as well as record from Compact Cassette to Microcassette.

Both of these "high-fidelity" microcassette recorders and the special Type IV blanks they required were relatively expensive and of limited availability, so the system was not widely adopted and Olympus phased them out after two years on the market. (Battery life also was a problem, because the high bias currents required by Type IV tape, combined with the state of battery technology at the time, meant that brand-new alkaline batteries might give out in two hours when the unit was in recording mode.) "Standard" microcassettes are still used in the underground music circuits for recording and distributing experimental music and field recordings/sound collages, mostly because of their lo-fi qualities. As of August 2021, Ohm Electric still produces microcassette tapes.

== Specifications ==
The original standard microcassette, the MC60, gives 30 minutes recording per side at its standard speed of 2.4 cm/s, and double that duration at 1.2 cm/s; an MC90, giving 45 minutes per side @ 2.4 cm/s, is also available from a few manufacturers. Unlike the Compact Cassette, a choice of recording speeds was provided on the original recorders and many others; the tape also spools in the opposite direction, from right to left. For transcription purposes, continuously variable speed was provided on many players. Microcassettes equalisation time constant: Type I (Ferric) at 200μs and Type IV (Metal) at 120μs.

== Competitors ==
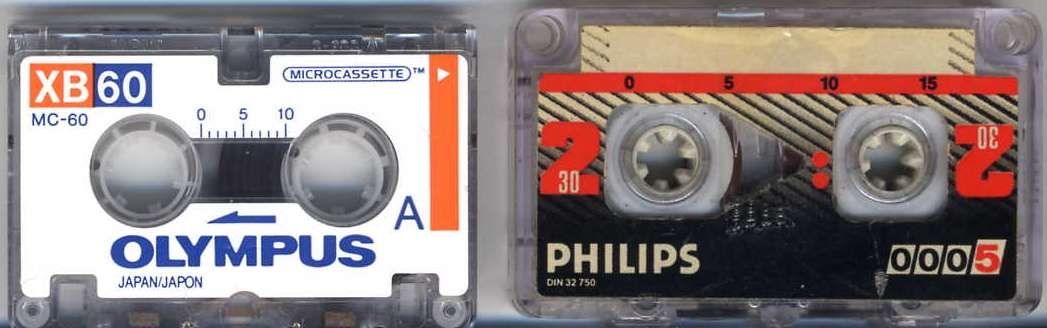
Comparison of Microcassette (left) and Mini-Cassette (right) formats

The microcassette was beaten to market by the Mini-Cassette, introduced by Philips in 1967. The mini-cassette is almost identical in appearance and dimensions to the microcassette, however it has thicker cogs for its reels and a slightly wider cassette. The mini-cassette, despite making it to market first, was less successful than the microcassette.

A couple of products were created to compete with the microcassette. Dictaphone and JVC introduced the picocassette in 1985, which is half the size of the microcassette. In 1992, Sony released the NT memo recording system, which employs a small cassette for digital recording.

== See also ==
- Audio tape specifications
- Steno-Cassette
- Soundwave (Transformers), a fictional character associated with microcassette technology

== External links and references ==
- Olympus History (includes reference to first microcassette recorder)
- Tech Flashback: The Microcasette – Part 1: The Tapes - Gough's Tech Zone
- Tech Flashback: The Microcasette – Part 2: The Recorders - Gough's Tech Zone
