= Mini-Cassette =

Audio cassette format

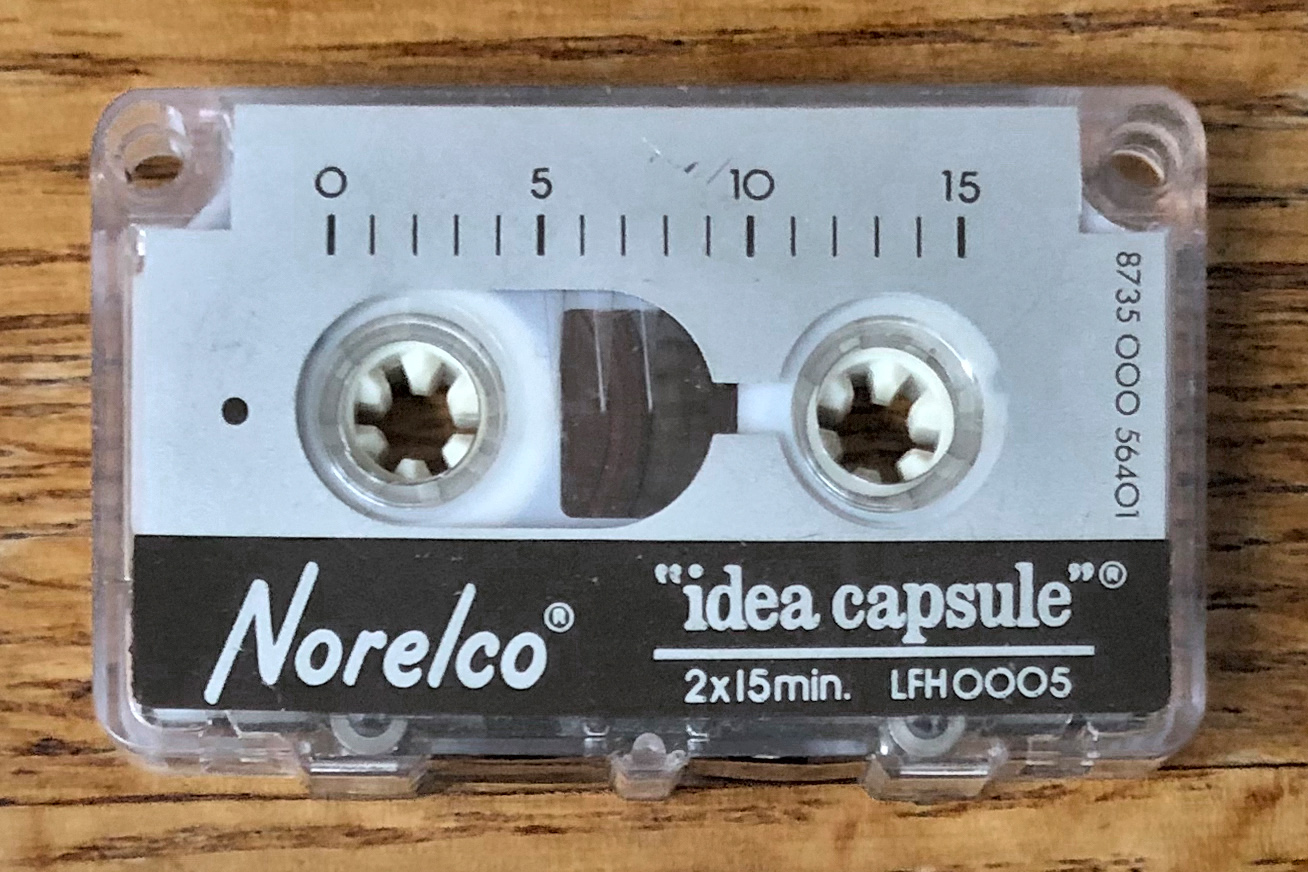
- Philips Norelco Mini-Cassette
- Media type: Magnetic cassette tape
- Encoding: analog signal and later digital
- Capacity: 30 minutes
- Read mechanism: tape head
- Write mechanism: magnetic recording head
- Developed by: Philips
- Usage: dictation
- Released: 1967; 59 years ago

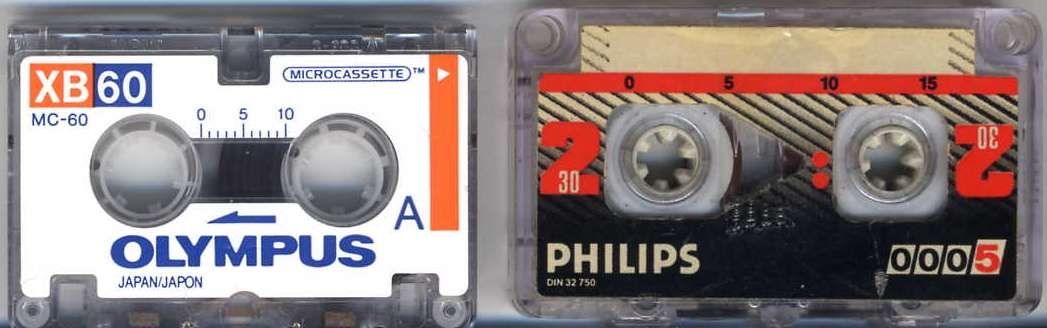
Mini-Cassette (right) compared to the rival Microcassette format (left)

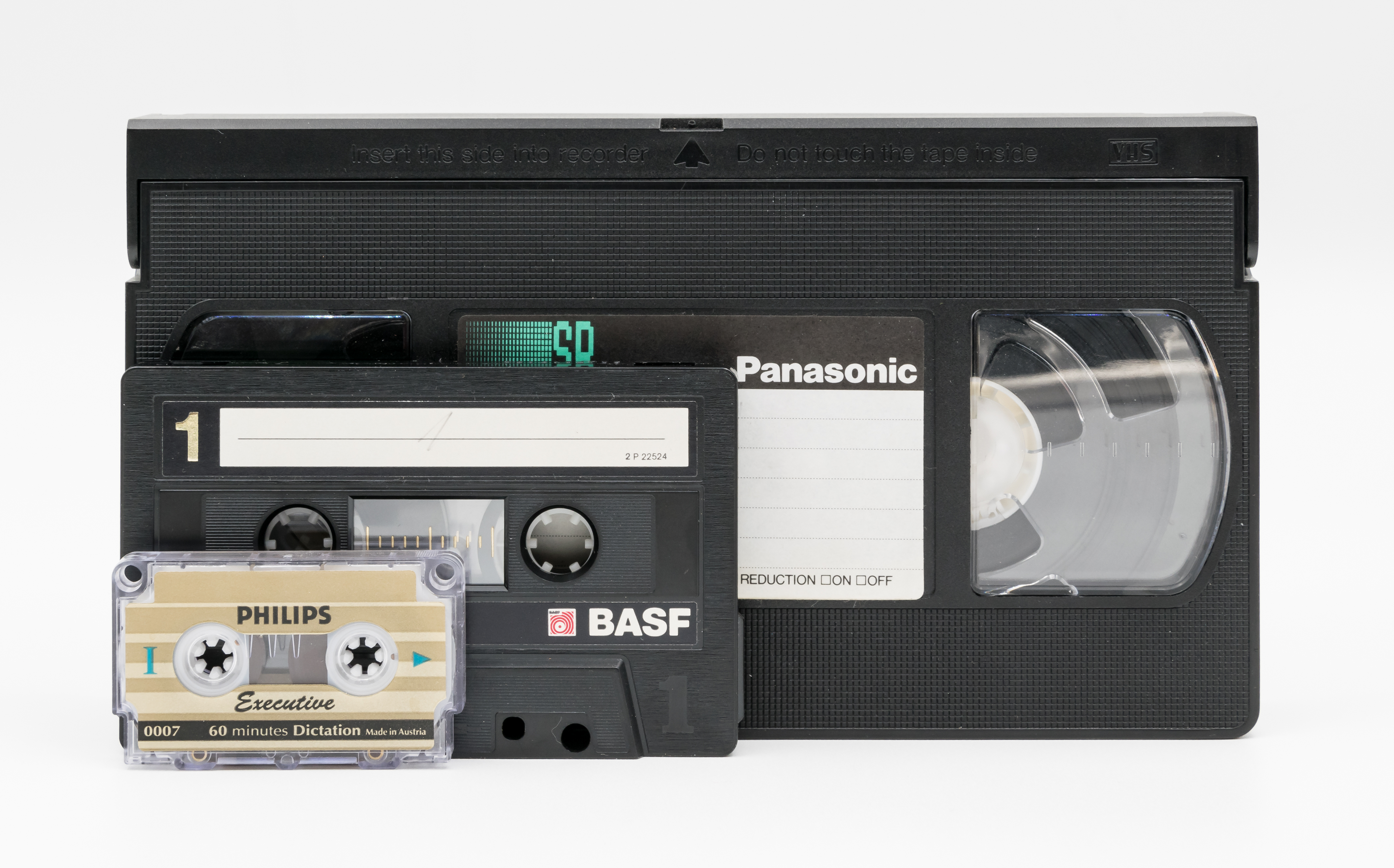
Size comparison of a VHS videocassette (rear), a Compact Cassette (centre) and a Mini-Cassette (front).

The Mini-Cassette, often written minicassette, is a magnetic tape analog audio cassette format introduced by Philips in 1967.

It is used primarily in dictation machines and was also employed as a data storage for the Philips P2000 home computer. In 2021, it was reported that Phillips still listed mini-cassette players along with new mini-cassette tapes on its website. As of May 2025, both are still listed.

== Design ==
Unlike the Compact Cassette, also designed by Philips, and the later Microcassette, introduced by Olympus, the Mini-Cassette does not use a capstan drive system; instead, the tape is propelled past the tape head by the reels.

This is mechanically simple and allows the cassette to be made smaller and easier to use, but produces a system unsuited to any task other than voice recording, as the tape speed is not constant (averaging 2.4 cm/s) and prone to wow and flutter.

However, the lack of a capstan and a pinch roller drive means that the tape is well-suited to being repeatedly shuttled forward and backward short distances as compared to microcassettes, leading to the Mini-Cassette's use in the first generations of telephone answering machines, and continuing use in the niche markets of dictation and transcription, where fidelity is not critical, but robustness of storage is, and where analog media remained in use long after digital media had been introduced.

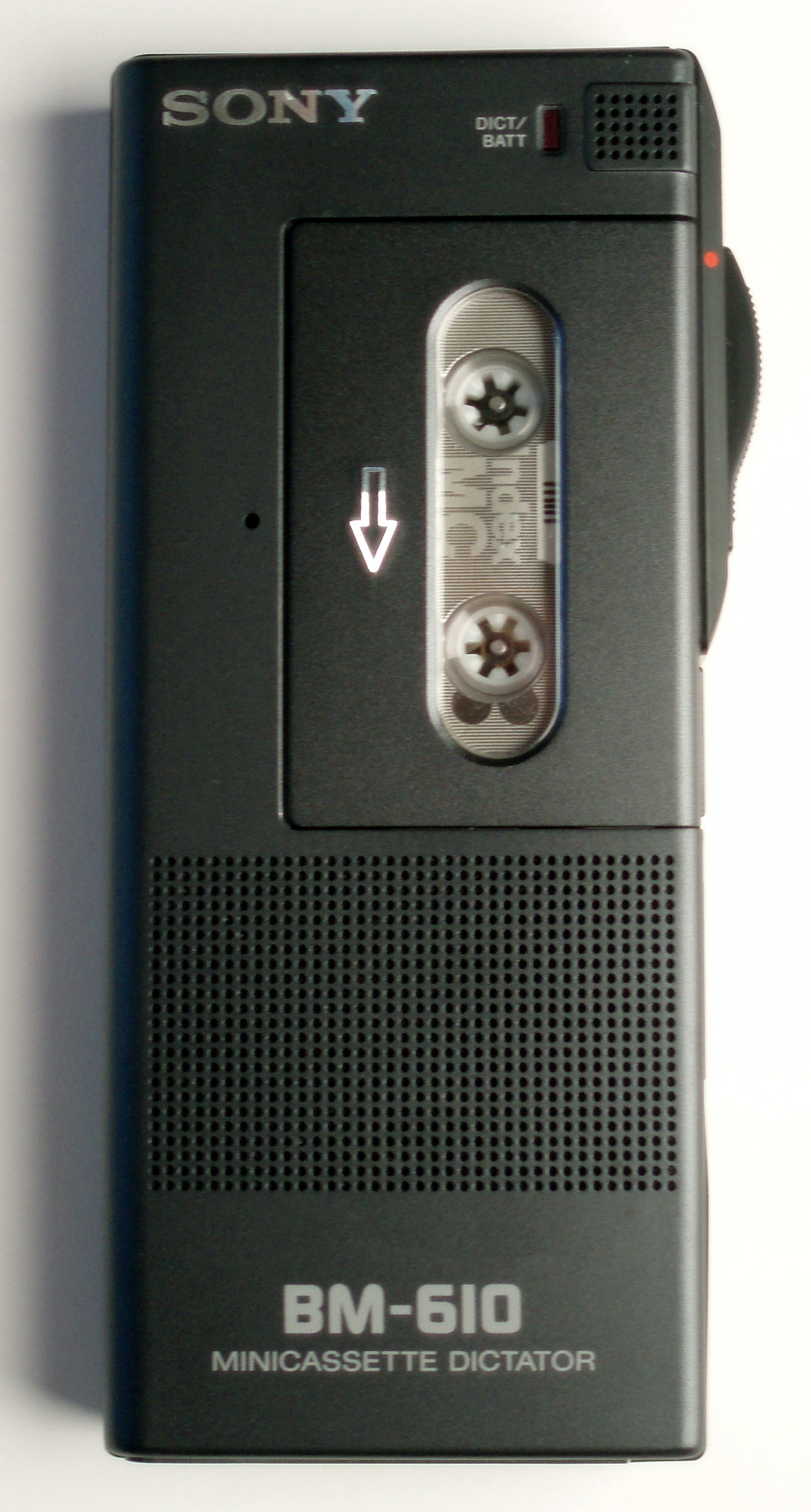
A Sony Mini-Cassette dictation recorder

In 1980, Philips released several recorder models (MDCR220, LDB4401, LDB4051, etc.) that encoded and read digital audio on standard mini-cassettes.

A computer model (the Philips P2000) also used the mini-cassette as a digital medium and provided automatic management of the drive, including search, space and directory management, fast-forward and rewind.

== Similar products ==
Philips later introduced a smaller version of the cassette called an Ultra Mini-Cassette that had a max record time of 10 minutes on each side of the tape.

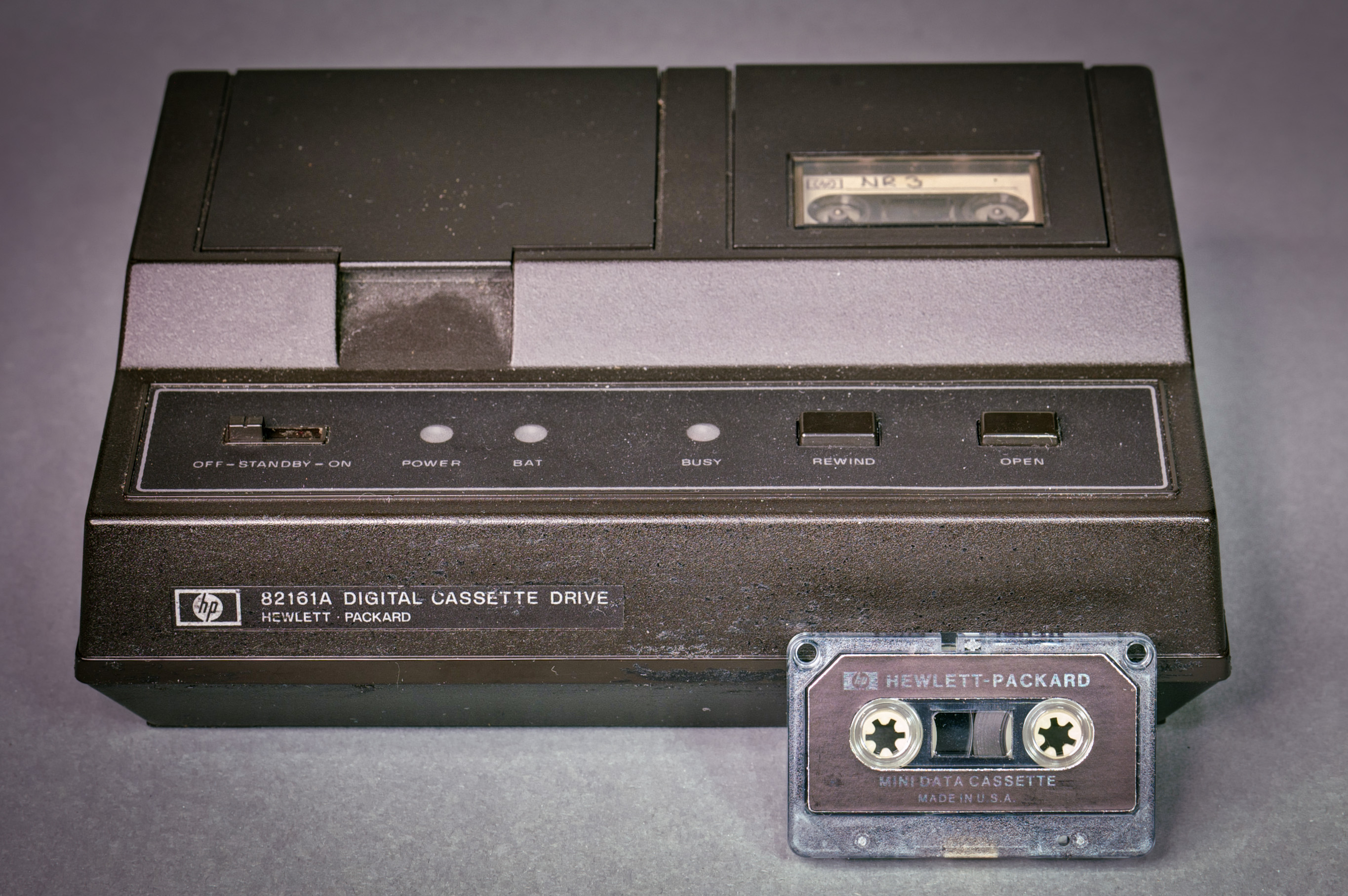
HP82161A cassette drive with Mini Data Cassette (with HP-IL connection)

A very similar (but incompatible) cassette format was produced by Hewlett-Packard and Verbatim (the HP82176A Mini Data Cassette) for data storage in their HP82161A tape drive, which, like other minicassettes, did not use a capstan.

== See also ==
- Microcassette
- Compact Cassette
- Steno-Cassette
- Picocassette
- NT (cassette)
