= DC-International =

Tape cassette format developed by Grundig

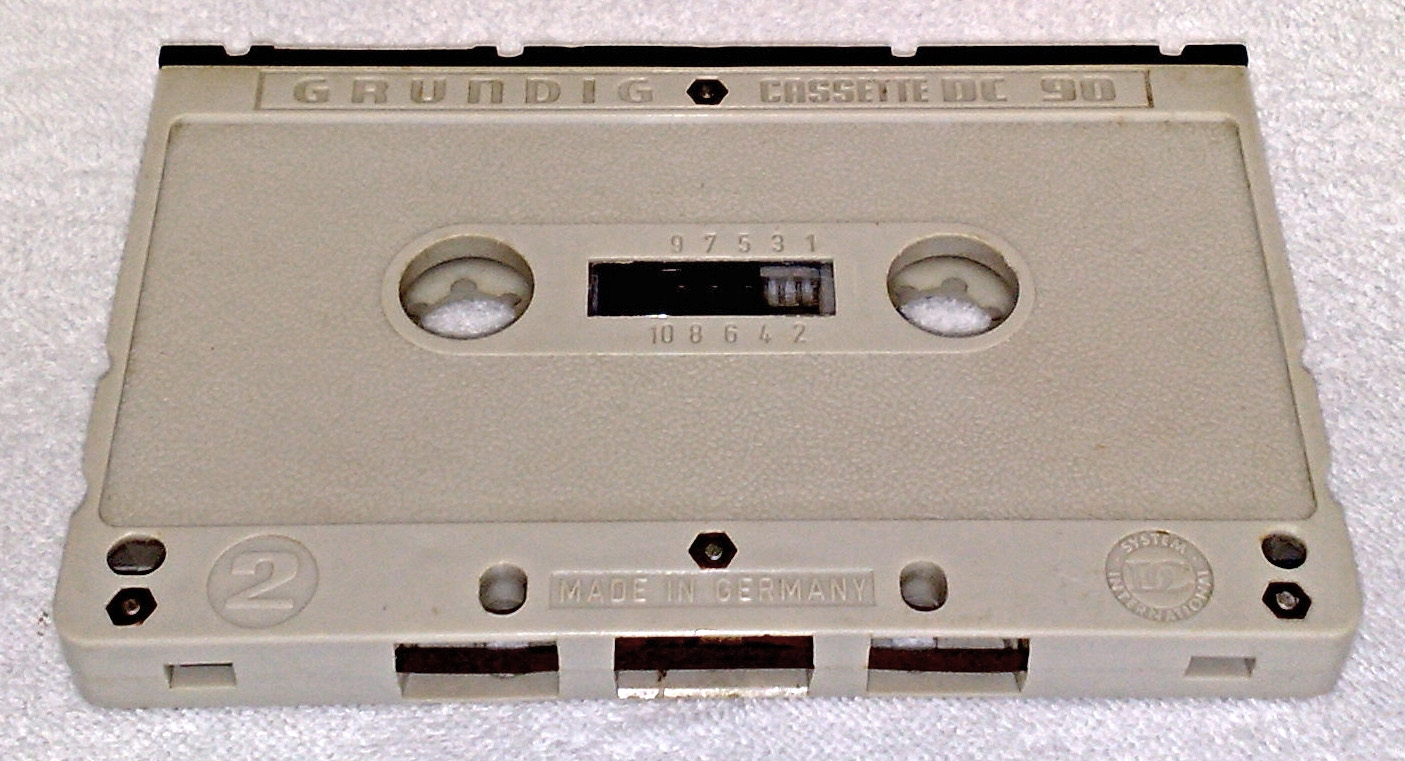
- DC-International cassette
- Media type: Magnetic tape cassette
- Encoding: Analog signal, in four tracks
- Capacity: 45 minutes and 60 minutes per side (DC 90 and DC 120)
- Read mechanism: Tape head
- Write mechanism: Tape head
- Developed by: Grundig
- Usage: Audio storage
- Extended from: Reel-to-reel audio tape recording
- Released: 1965; 60 years ago

DC-International is an analog audio cassette format developed by Grundig and marketed in 1965. DC is the abbreviation of "Double Cassette", as the cassette contained two reels; International was intended to indicate that, from the beginning, several companies around the world supported the format with suitable tape cassette recorders, recorded music cassettes and blank cassettes. Since DC-International did not compete effectively against the similar Compact Cassette, it was discontinued in 1967. In 1971, Grundig would later introduce a dictation cassette format known as Steno-Cassette. Unlike DC International, Steno-Cassette would become popular and widely used within Germany.

Starting in 1961, Philips (in conjunction with Grundig) began work in its Vienna tape production facilities, on a (HiFi)-compatible single-hole cassette. At the same time, a Philips team in Belgium developed a 2-hole cassette, under the name Pocket Recorder (later-named Compact Cassette). Philips' management finally gave preference to this development, but informed its partner Grundig rather late, which led Grundig - who received an offer to participate in the Pocket Recorder, to abandon the DC-International cassette it developed without further ado. This was based upon construction drawings of the compact cassette, which Grundig had taken after their negotiations with Philips.

The DC-International system was presented at the 1965 Stuttgart, Germany, radio exhibition. At that time, Grundig was the largest tape recorder manufacturer worldwide and wanted to be represented in the newly created tape cassette market, as well.

== Construction ==
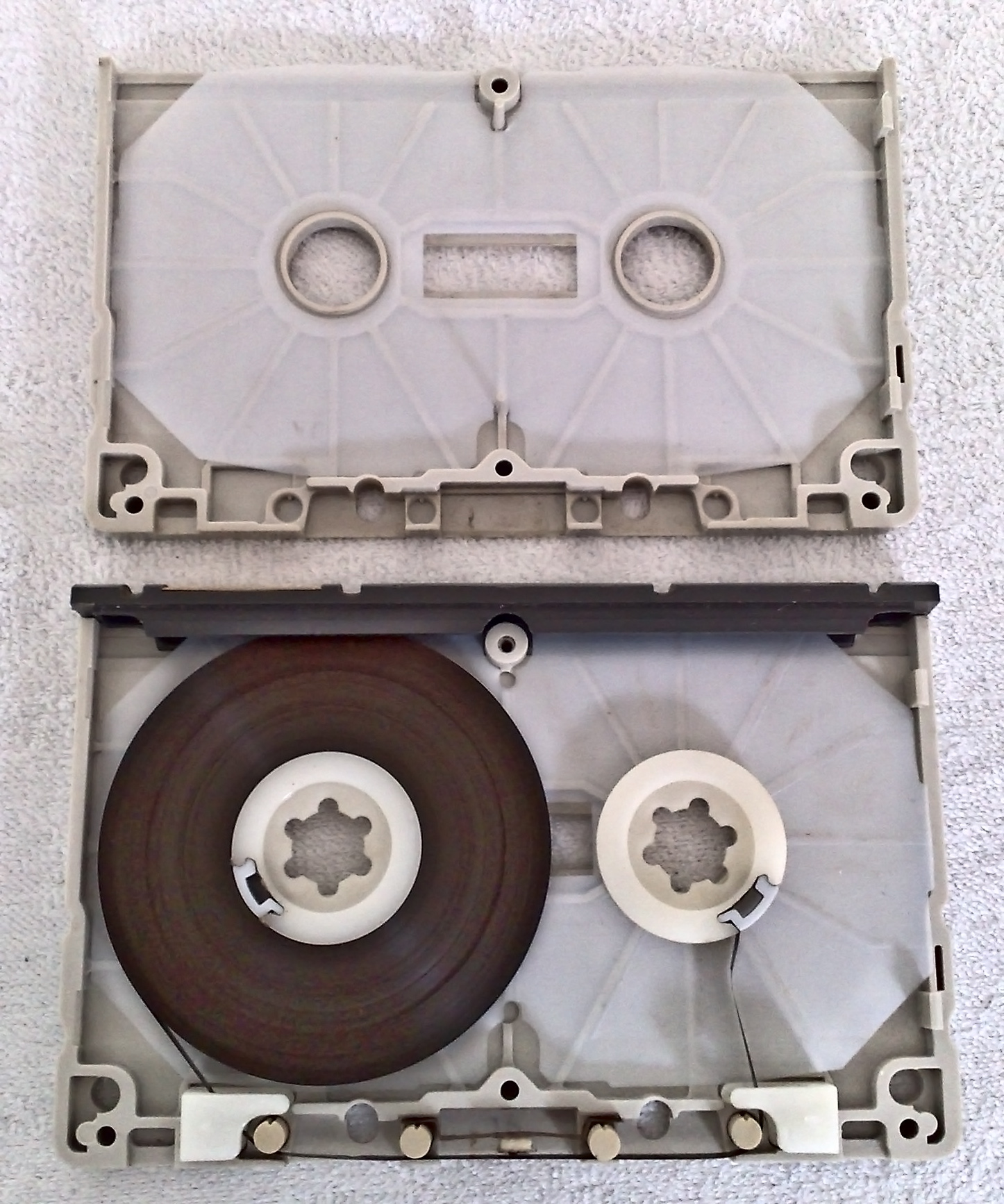
Construction of a DC-International cassette

The DC-International cassette is a two-roll cassette tape which can be flipped over. The dimensions of a tape cassette (according to the DC-International system) are 120 mm × 77 mm × 12 mm, the weight is 65 grams (2.3 oz). The case is made of polystyrene, and a viewing window with scale incorporated into it, was included, so a user could view the tape from both sides of the cassette. The cassette has openings for the tape head and the erase head, as well as for the capstan pinch roller. A built-in pressure pad provides for tape-head contact.

Like the Compact Cassette would later have, a recording lock against unintentional erasure of a cassette was present in the form of 2 recesses in the cassette. If an opening is closed, it prevents any recording on that side. For protection against dust and scratches, the cassette can be inserted into a protective case when not in use. The tape's capable of recording 2 soundtracks in opposite directions. The tape speed is 5.08 cm/s = 2 ips, slightly faster than the Compact Cassette. Recording and playback in stereophonic sound would be possible with stereo devices, but there were never any such devices manufactured for this cassette format.

For a 90-minute DC-90 cassette (45 minutes per side), the tape length is 137 m with a triple play band (PES 18, thickness 0.018 mm). For a 120-minute DC-120 cartridge (60 minutes per side), the tape length is 185 m with quadruple play band (PES 12, thickness 0.012 mm). The tape itself consisted of polyester.

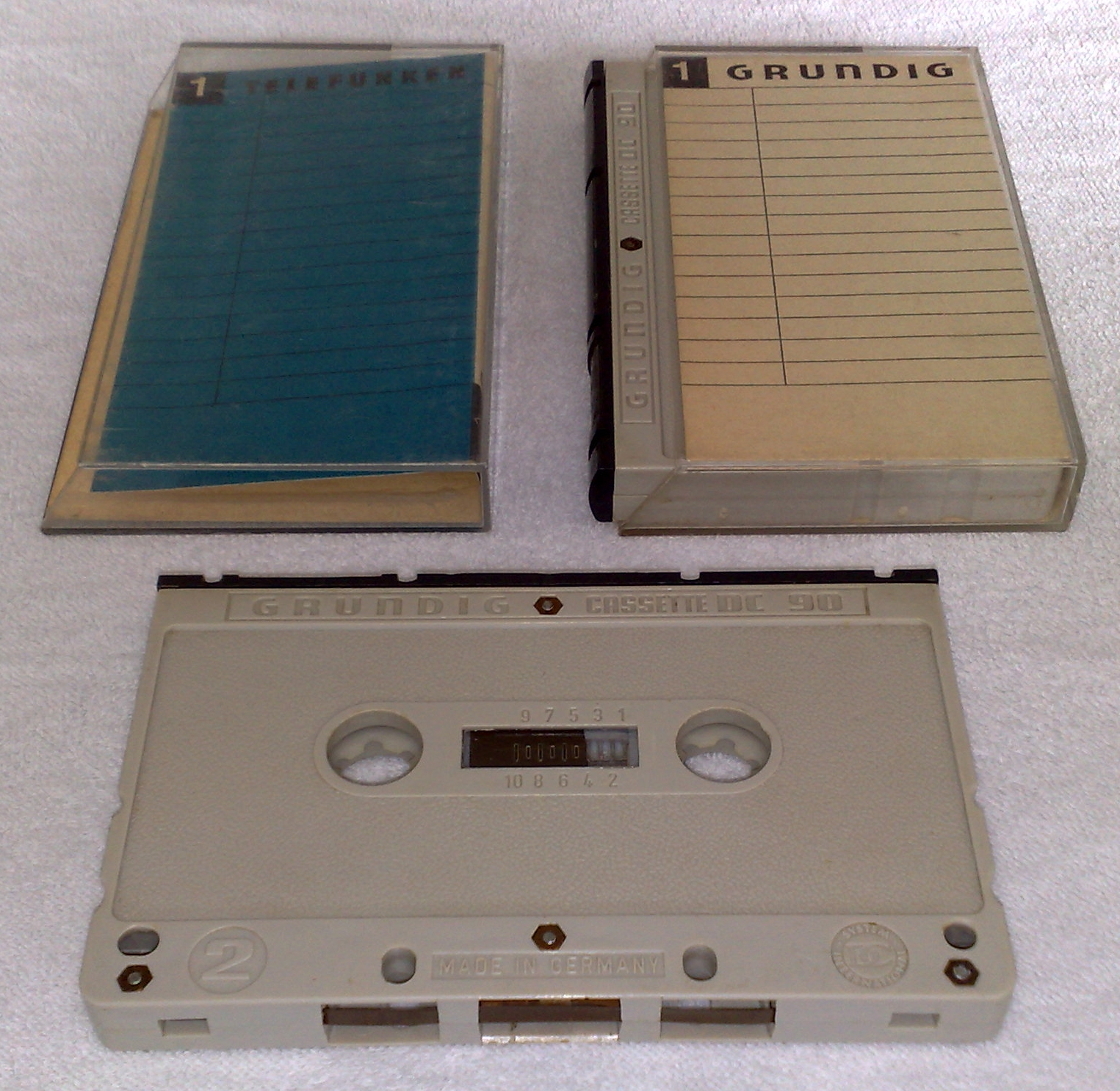
DC-International empty cartridges and covers

With the DC-International format, the focus was on music playback right from the start. At its launch, there were 25 pre-recorded music cassettes from Telefunken, Decca and RCA Victor available. These recordings on the cassettes ranged from country music to The Rolling Stones, the playing time is about 30 minutes per side. With a total playing time of about 60 minutes available, this was comparable to a phonograph record. The selling price of a pre-recorded cassette was 24 DM.

For home recordings, unrecorded, blank cassettes were available from Grundig, Telefunken, BASF and Agfa-Gevaert. These blank cassettes were available as both 90 minutes and 120 minutes of running time. A DC 90 blank cassette cost 12 DM, and a DC 120 blank cassette 15 DM.

DC-International cassettes were still commercially available a few years after the players' production had been discontinued. Recorded music cassettes were later distributed by Autoplay-Musikkassetten GmbH of Fuerth, Bavaria.

Unrecorded cassettes were also produced for several years. An unrecorded DC 90 cassette was later 11 DM, and the DC 120 cassette fetched 14 DM.

== Cassette machines ==
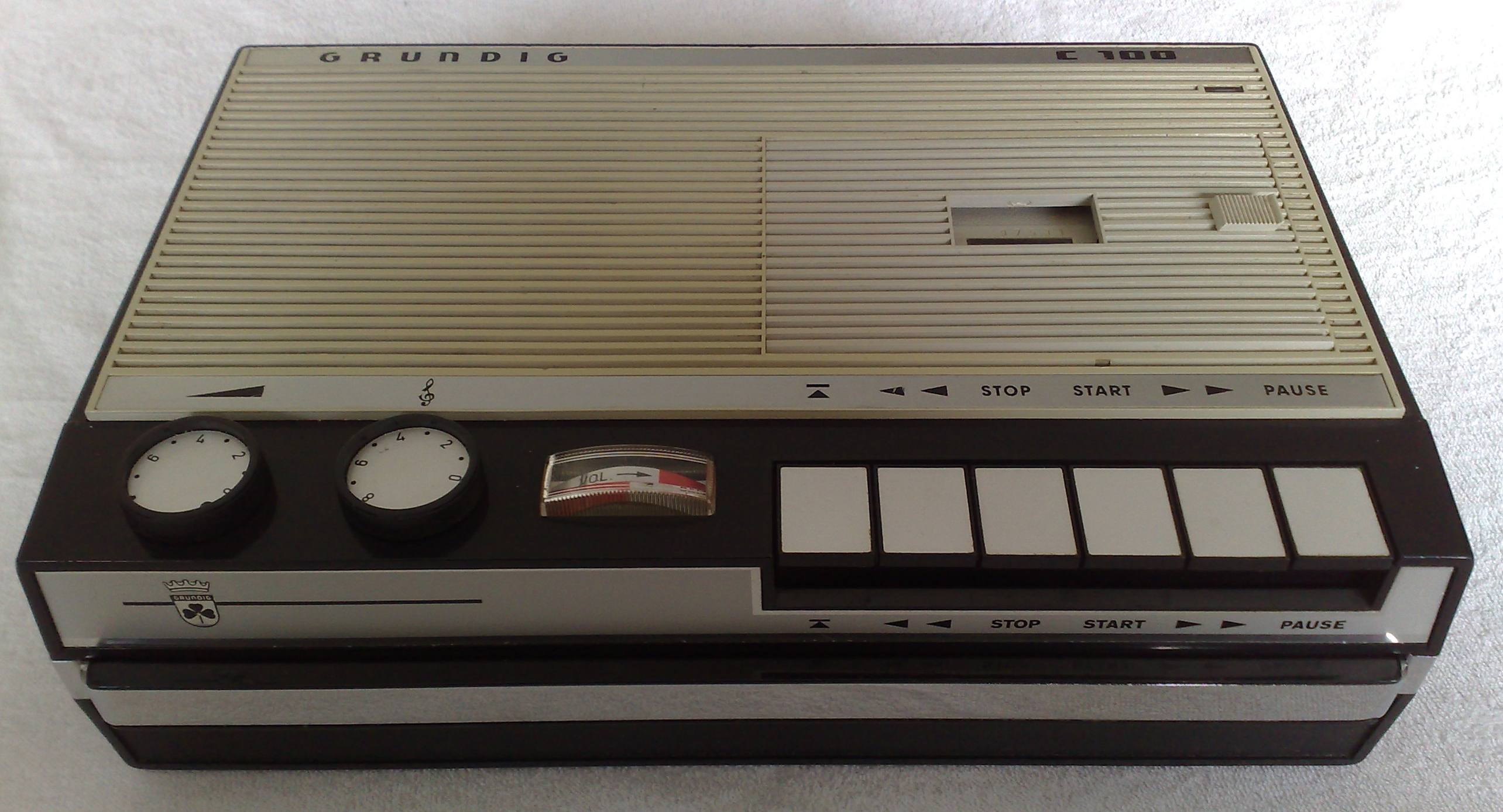
Grundig C 100

Several portable cassette tape players were made using transistor technology and for installation in a motor vehicle. As portable devices, the Grundig C 100 was the first cassette tape recorder manufactured by Grundig and a similar model Magnetophon 401 by Telefunken. Both devices are battery powered, though an optional AC adapter was available. The power supply is stored inside the battery compartment and is hidden completely. The sales price of both devices was 298 DM.

The Grundig C 100 was later replaced by the 2 slightly revised Grundig C 100 L models and the parallel model of the Grundig C 110 and replaced it later. The Grundig C 110 can be operated on electric power only - no portable options were available. For cars which did not feature a built-in radio, the Grundig AC 50 was able to connect to an existing radio head unit. The Grundig AC 60 contained a built-in 5-watt amplifier, as well as a volume and tone control. This model had no radio receiver uncoated into it, though Blaupunkt released 2 models of car tape recorders - identical to the Grundig models, as they were manufactured by Grundig. All built-in devices are only capable of playback.

== Discontinuation ==
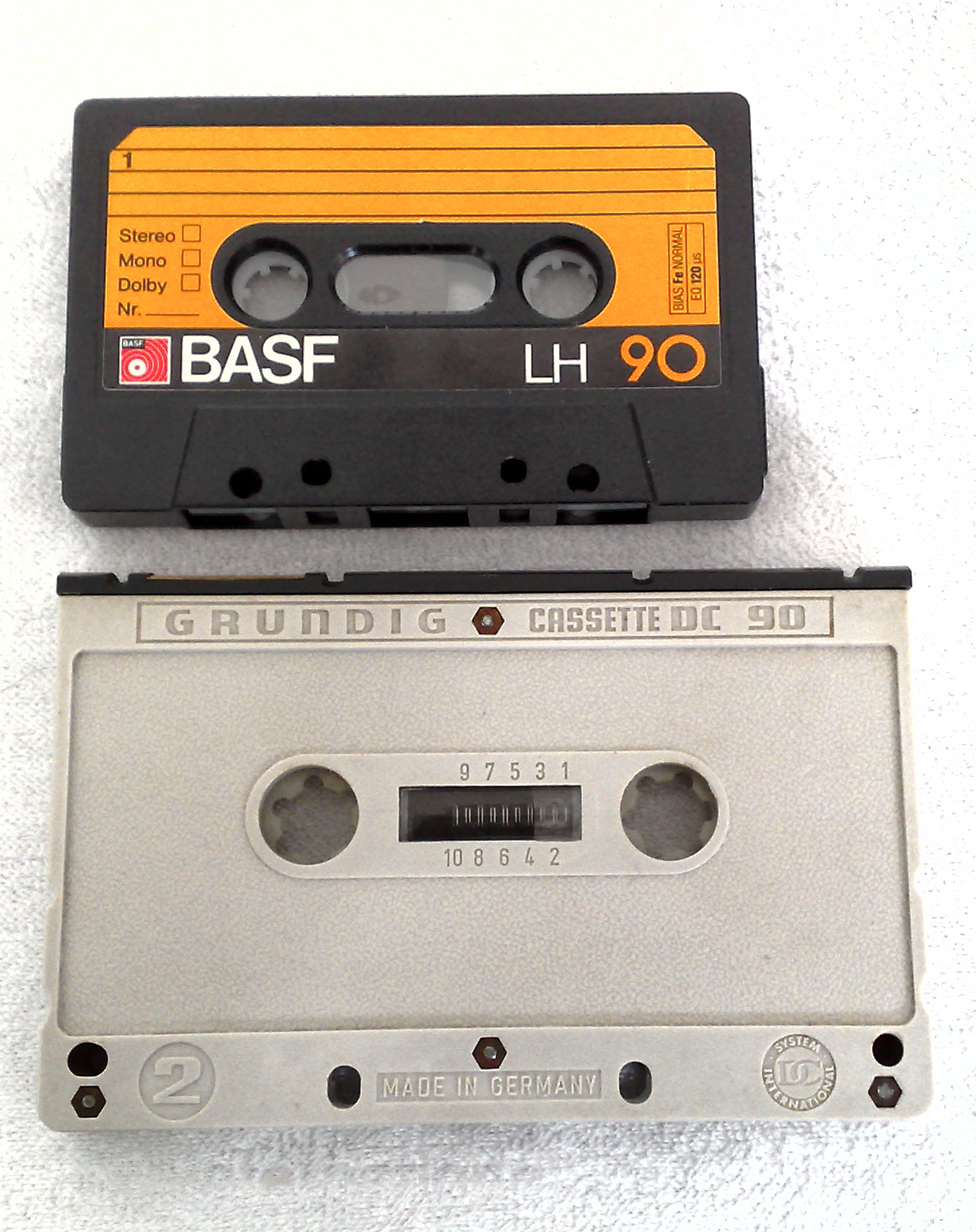
Comparison of the now-standard Compact Cassette (top) to the DC-International (bottom)

After just two years, the DC-International system was discontinued in favor of the Compact Cassette. At the 1967 Hannover Exhibition Telefunken announced it was ending support for the format, followed shortly after by Grundig at the 25th Radio Exhibition Berlin (IFA). At IFA, Grundig presented its Grundig C 200, a tape recorder for Compact Cassettes.

== List of prerecorded cassettes ==
At the launch of the DC-International, pre-recorded cassettes from Telefunken, Decca, and RCA Victor were available.

- TTP 90000 Buntes Nachmittagskonzert
- TTP 90001 Gute Fahrt mit Schwung und Rhythmus
- TTP 90002 Im Reich der Operette
- TTP 90003 Große Marschparade
- TTP 90005 Musikalische Rundreise
- DTP 90006 Singen, Lachen, Tanzen
- TTP 90007 Melodie und Rhythmus
- TTP 90009 Drei Meisteroperetten
- TTP 90010 Cocktails For Two
- TTP 90011 Erinnern Sie sich?
- DTP 90012 In der kleinen Bar
- DTP 90013 The Fantastic Rolling Stones
- DTP 90014 Durchs deutsche Heimatland
- DTP 90015 Musik für dich
- DTP 90016 Große Stars – große Erfolge
- DTP 90017 Tanzen und Singen mit Catrin, Silvio und Vico
- DTP 90018 Die große Musical Show
- DTP 90020 Zauberwelt der Melodien
- DTP 90021 Jetzt geht’s los
- RTP 90022 Western Saloon
- RTP 90023 Teenager Melodie
- RTP 90024 America’s Favourite Bands
- TTP 90025 Bunt gemischt
- DTP 90026 Die schlagen ein
- TTP 90027 Mal dies – mal das

== See also ==
- Compact Cassette
- Steno-Cassette
