= Steno-Cassette =

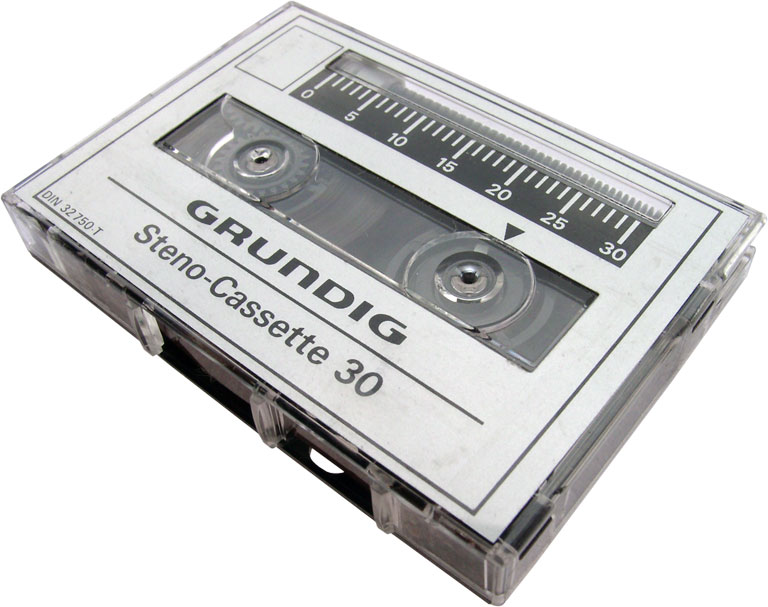
- The Steno-Cassette can be distinguished from other formats by its integrated tape counter.
- Media type: Magnetic tape cassette
- Encoding: analog signal
- Capacity: 30 min
- Read mechanism: tape head
- Write mechanism: tape head
- Standard: DIN 32750
- Developed by: Grundig
- Usage: stenography
- Released: 1971; 54 years ago

The Steno-Cassette is an analog cassette format for dictation, introduced by Grundig in 1971. Unlike Grundig's previous cassette format, DC-International, the Steno-Cassette gained widespread use in Germany, where it was established as a DIN standard (DIN 32750) in 1985. It is easily distinguished from other dictation cassette formats (such as the Microcassette) by the integrated tape counter index, showing the amount of tape available.

== See also ==
- Microcassette
- Mini-Cassette
- Picocassette
- NT (cassette)
