= Picocassette =

Audio cassette format

- Media type: Magnetic cassette tape
- Encoding: Analog signal
- Capacity: 30 minutes
- Read mechanism: Tape head
- Write mechanism: Magnetic recording head
- Developed by: Dictaphone and JVC
- Usage: Dictation
- Released: 1985; 41 years ago

Picocassette is an analog audio cassette format introduced by Dictaphone in collaboration with JVC in 1985.

The Picocassette was introduced to compete with the Microcassette, introduced by Olympus, and the Mini-Cassette, by Philips.

== Size ==
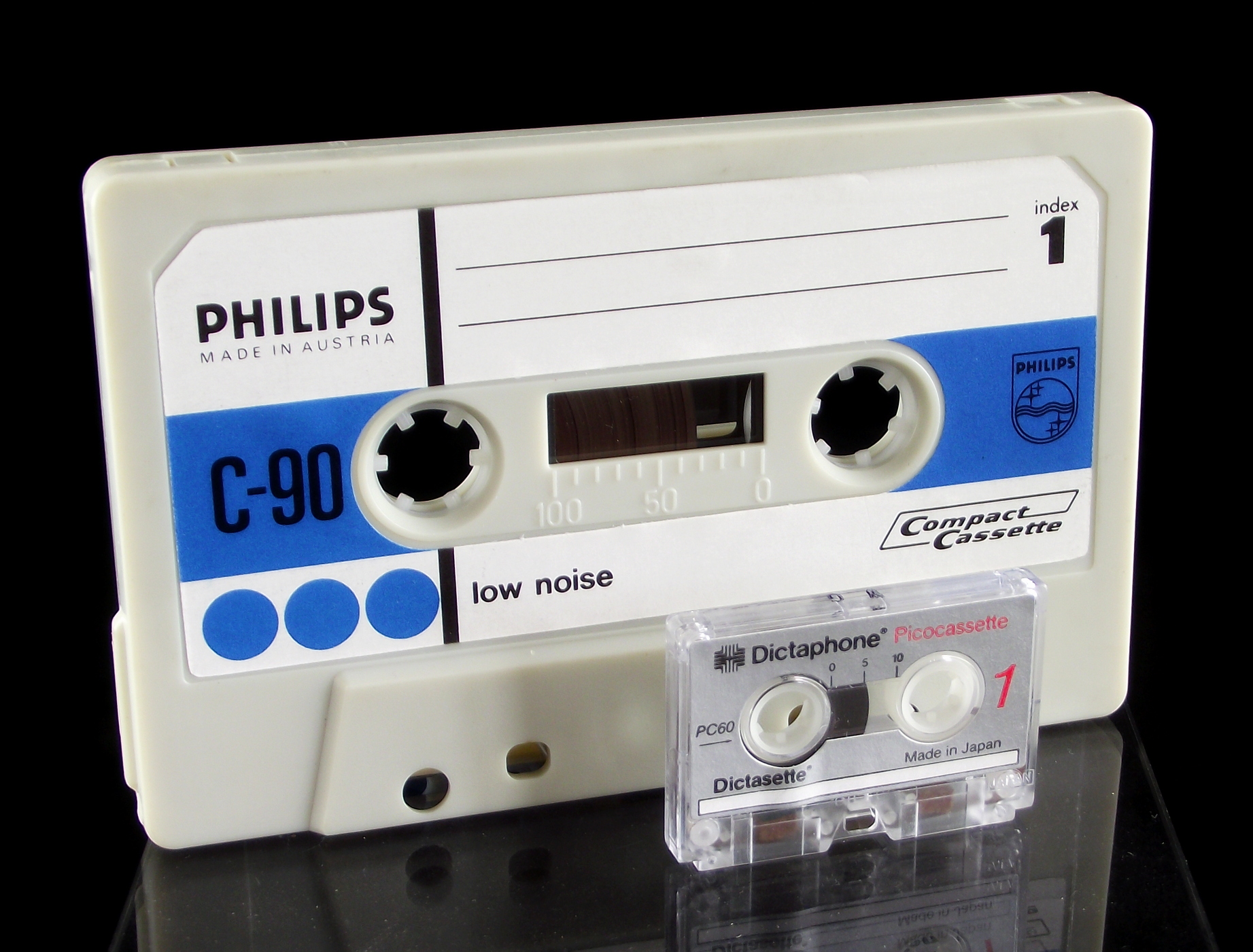
A picocassette compared to a Compact cassette

It is approximately half the size of the previous Microcassette, and was intended for highly portable dictation devices. With a tape speed of 9 mm/s, each cassette could hold up to 60 minutes of dictation, 30 minutes per side. The signal-to-noise ratio was 35 dB. The largest dimension of the picocassette was near 42 mm (1.7 in).

== See also ==
- Microcassette
- Mini-Cassette
- Steno-Cassette
- NT (cassette)
