= NT (cassette) =

Audio cassette format developed by Sony

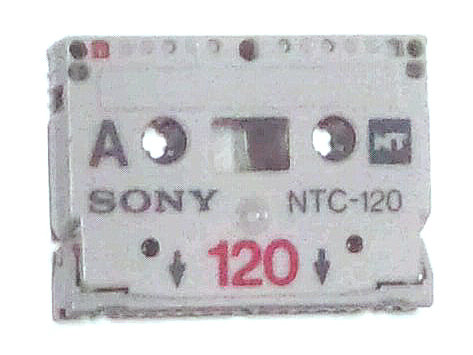
- Sony NT format "NTC-120" cassette
- Media type: Magnetic cassette tape
- Encoding: digital
- Capacity: 120 minutes
- Read mechanism: Rotating head
- Write mechanism: Rotating head, helical scan
- Developed by: Sony
- Usage: dictation

NT (sometimes marketed under the name Scoopman) is a digital audio cassette format introduced by Sony in 1992.

The NT cassette was introduced as a memo recording system to compete with the Microcassette, introduced by Olympus, and the Mini-Cassette, by Philips.

== Design ==
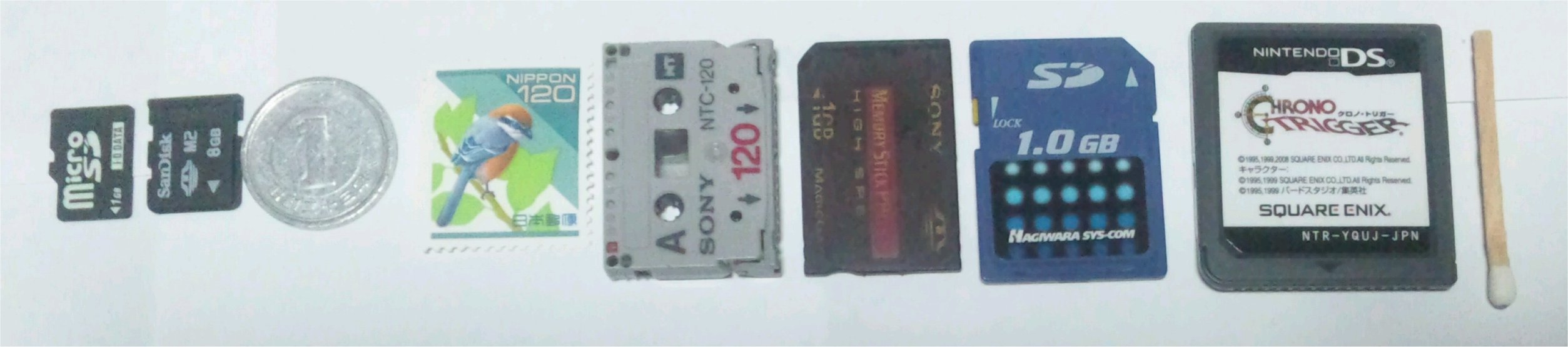
NT cassette compared to various memory cards

The design was a rotating head based system which stored memos using helical scan on special microcassettes, which were 30 mm × 21.5 mm × 5 mm with a tape width of 2.5 mm, with a recording capacity of up to 120 minutes similar to Digital Audio Tape. The cassettes are offered in three versions: The Sony NTC-60, -90, and -120, each describing the length of time (in minutes) the cassette can record.

NT stands for Non-Tracking, meaning the head does not precisely follow the tracks on the tape. Instead, the head moves over the tape at approximately the correct angle and speed, but performs more than one pass over each track. The data in each track is stored on the tape in blocks with addressing information that enables reconstruction in memory from several passes. This considerably reduced the required mechanical precision, reducing the complexity, size, and cost of the recorder.

Another feature of NT cassettes is Non-Loading, which means instead of having a mechanism to pull the tape out of the cassette and wrap it around the drum, the drum is pushed inside the cassette to achieve the same effect. This also significantly reduces the complexity, size, and cost of the mechanism.

Audio sampling is in stereo at 32 kHz with 12 bit nonlinear quantization, corresponding to 17 bit linear quantization. Data written to the tape is packed into data blocks and encoded with LDM-2 low deviation modulation.

== Uses ==
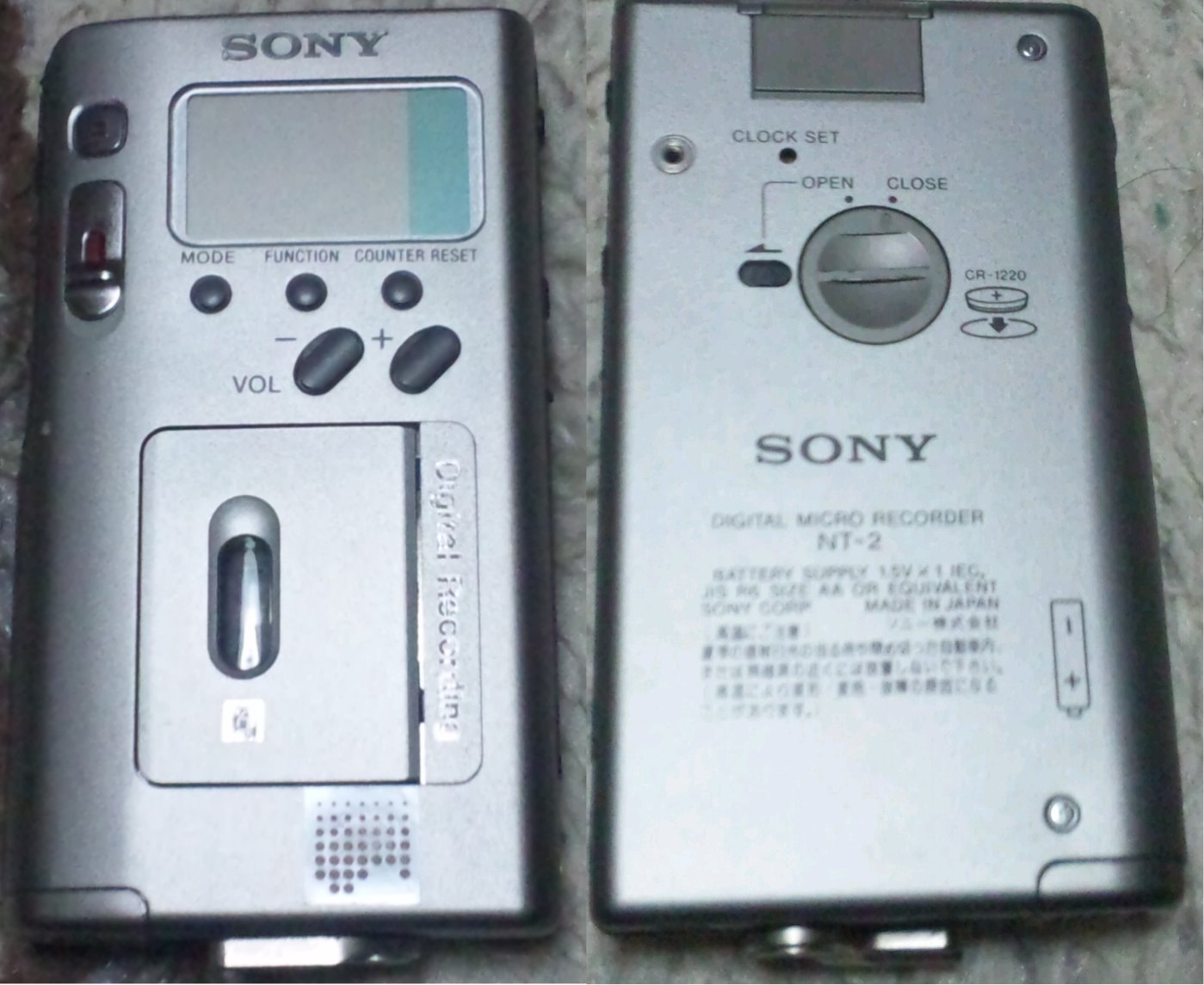
Sony NT-2 Digital Micro Recorder

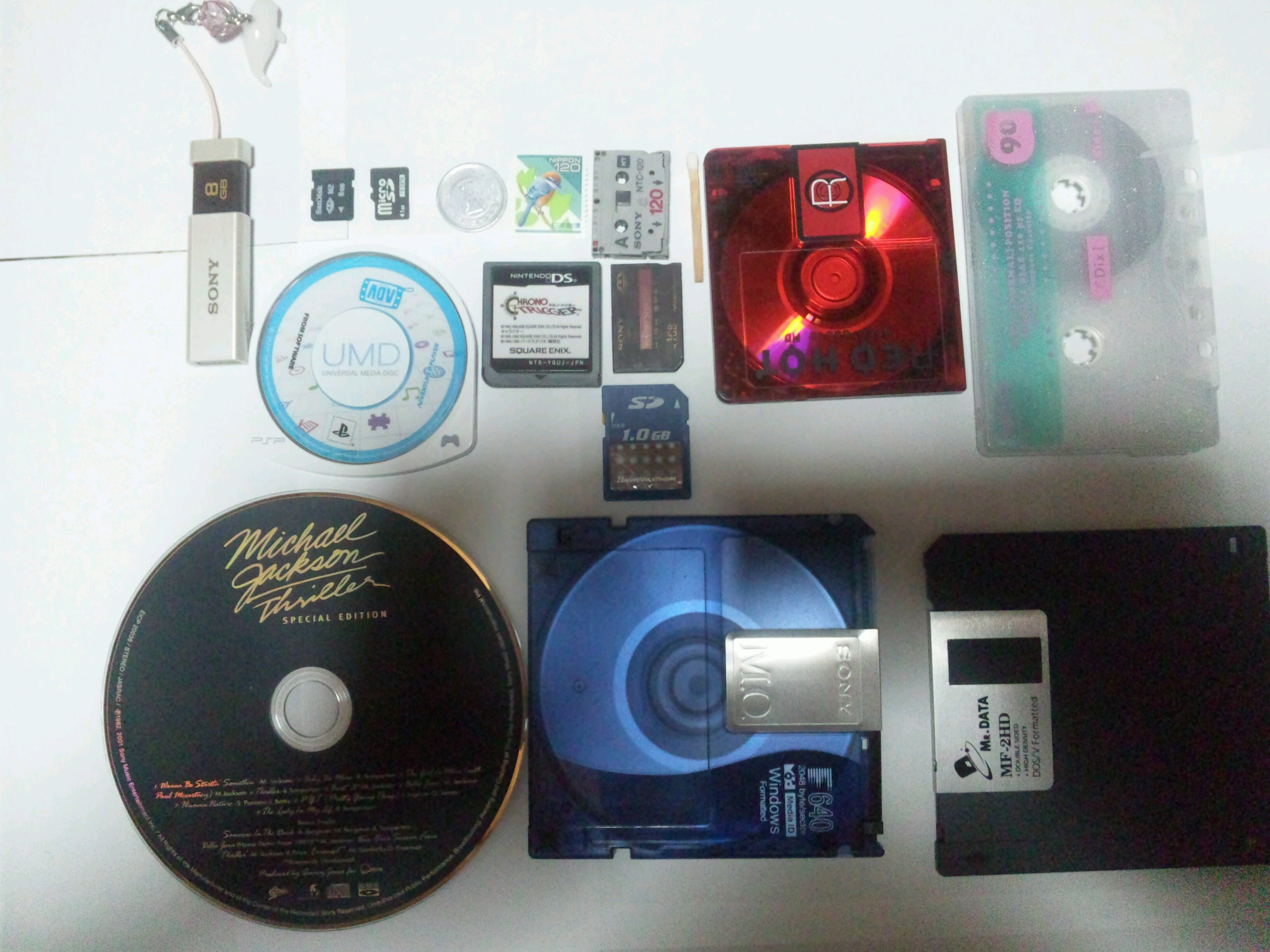
NT cassette compared to various recording media

The Sony NT-1 Digital Micro Recorder, introduced in 1992, features a real-time clock that records a time signal on the digital track along with the sound data, making it useful for journalism, police and legal work. Due to the machine's buffer memory, the NT-2 is capable of automatically reversing the tape direction at the end of the reel without an interruption in the sound. The recorder uses a single "AA"-size cell for primary power, plus a separate CR-1220 lithium cell to provide continuous power to the real-time clock. The Sony NT-2, an improved successor to the Sony NT-1 Digital Micro Recorder, introduced in 1996, was the final machine in the series.

NT cassettes were used in the film industry and law enforcement, as the quality was superior to most portable audio recorders in that time period. The data portion embedded in the recording made it an excellent choice for law enforcement in addition to recording to a proprietary tape in a proprietary format.

As digital technology evolved, and became accepted in US court systems, the NT2 was replaced by devices that recorded to internal drives and removable digital media. The new media was much more cost-effective, and yielded premium quality audio recordings at a lesser cost. It was also easier to make court admissible copies utilizing other media, besides NT2 cassettes.

Rebranded NT cassettes were used as the storage medium in the Datasonix Pereos backup system from 1994, claiming a capacity of up to 1.25 gigabytes per tape. Due to overhead and variable data compression ratios, the actual amount of data stored could be significantly below a gigabyte.

== See also ==
- Digital Audio Tape
- Microcassette
- Mini-Cassette
- Steno-Cassette
- Picocassette
