= Digital Tape Format =

Digital Tape Format is a magnetic tape data storage format developed by Sony. It uses a 1/2" wide tape, in a cassette with two reels, which is written and read with a helical scan process. The format is described by the ECMA 248 (adopted June 1998) and ISO/IEC 15731 standards. There are two sizes of tape cassettes, "S" and "L".

== Generations ==

Generation	DTF-1	DTF-2
Release Date	1994	1999
"S" Capacity (GB)	12	60
"L" Capacity (GB)	42	200
Max Speed (MB/s)	12	24

Notes:

- Both used ALDC compression
- DTF-2 used Fibre Channel or SCSI interfaces
- The tape cassettes are similar to those of Sony Betacam.
