= Elcaset =

Analog audio format based on tape

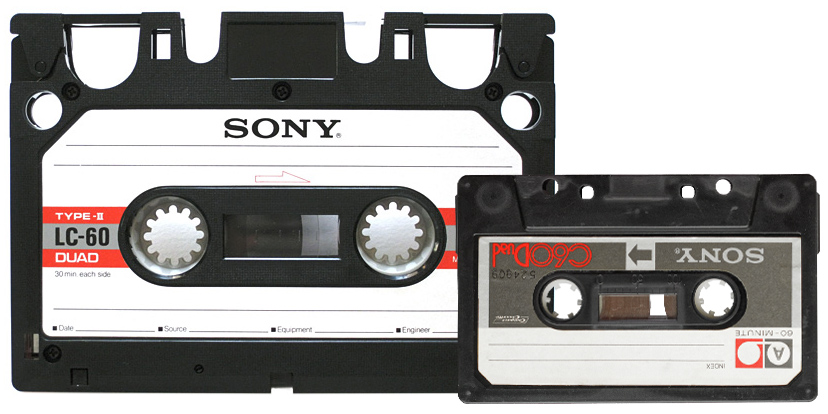
- Size comparison of Elcaset (left) with standard Compact Cassette
- Media type: Magnetic cassette tape
- Capacity: 30 minutes and 45 minutes per side (LC-60 and LC-90)
- Developed by: Sony, Panasonic, and Teac
- Usage: Audio storage
- Released: 1976

Elcaset is an analog audio cassette format jointly developed by Sony, Panasonic, and Teac in 1976, bearing remote similarity to a format introduced 20 years earlier as the RCA tape cartridge.

== History ==
In 1976, it was widely felt that the compact cassette was never likely to be capable of the same levels of performance that was available from reel-to-reel systems, yet clearly the cassette had advantages in terms of convenience. The Elcaset system was intended to marry the performance of reel-to-reel with cassette convenience, but be more of a compromise on size between the two than the RCA cassette is. The name "Elcaset" may simply mean L-cassette, or large cassette, since the 1/4" tape inside is double the 1/8" width found in compact cassettes. They were divided into four tracks.

The system is technically sound, but a nearly complete failure in the marketplace, with a very low take-up by a few audiophiles only. Apart from the problem of the bulky cassettes, the performance of compact cassettes had improved dramatically with the use of new materials such as chromium dioxide, Dolby B noise reduction, and better manufacturing quality. For most people, the quality of compact cassettes was adequate, and the benefits of the expensive Elcaset system limited. Audiophiles turned away from Elcaset and towards high-end compact cassette decks from companies like Nakamichi, which began making very high-quality tape decks using the compact audio cassette in late 1973, even three years before the Elcaset was released. The tapes they made could be played on any compact cassette machine. Also, the Elcaset machines were expensive. Elcaset was featured at the 1978 Northern Audio Fair in Harrogate, Yorks (three hotels along Ripon Road) and was to be seen at UK audio retailers in that year but promotion withered towards the end of that year and Elcaset machines were disappearing during early 1979.

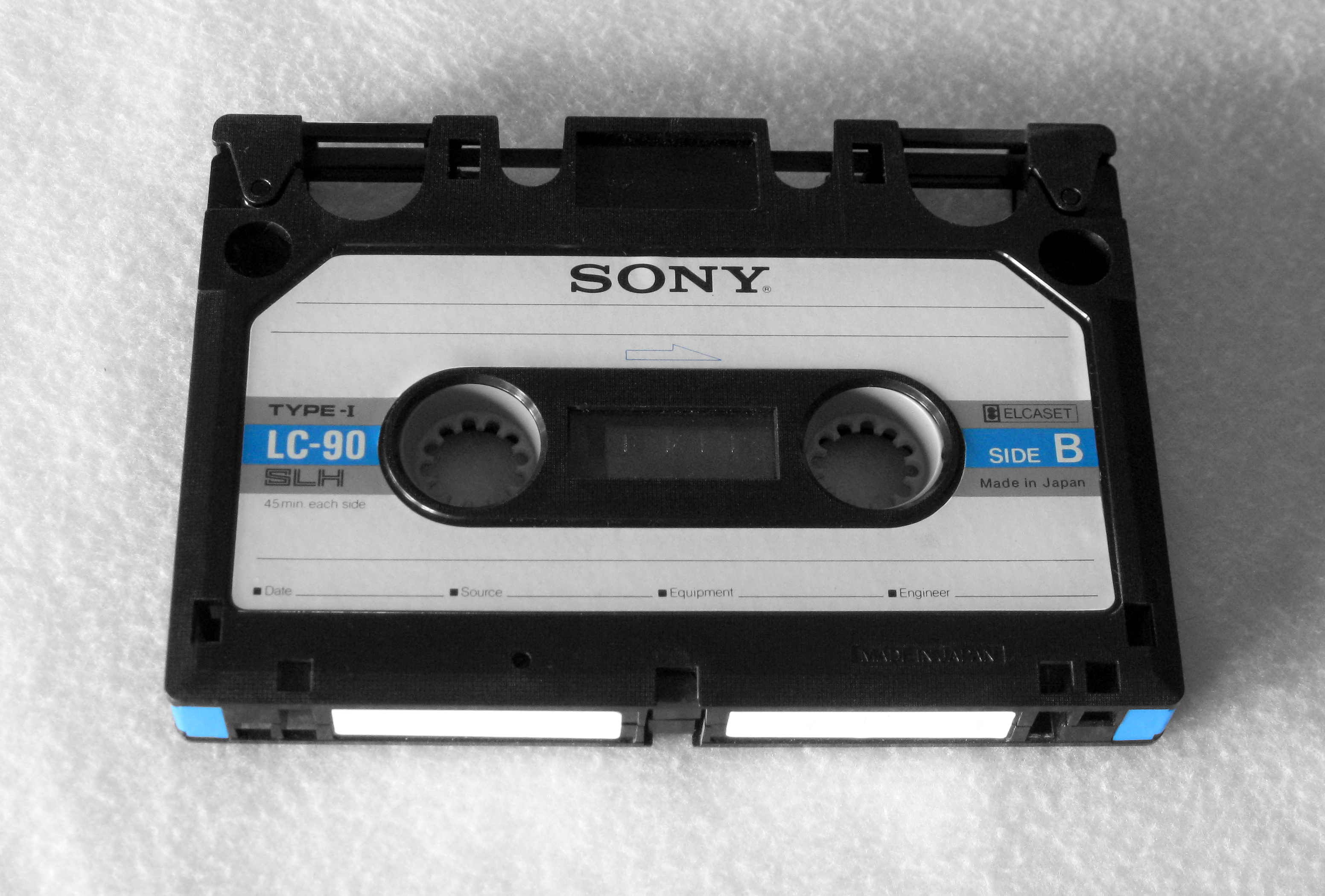
Sony LC-90 Elcaset

The Elcaset system was abandoned in 1980, when all the remaining systems were sold off in Finland.

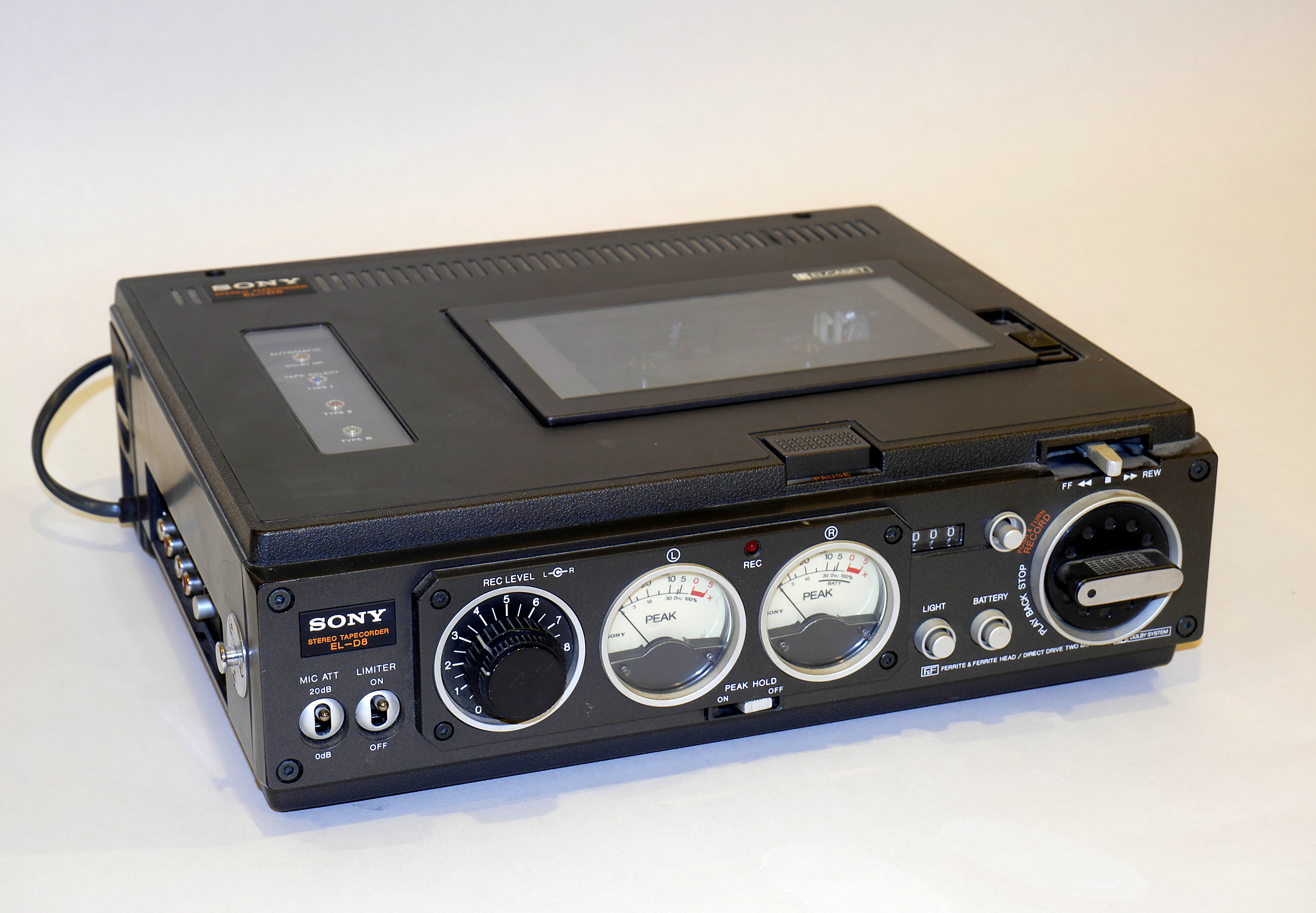
Sony EL-D8 (1978–1980)

In 2017, musician Jeremy Heiden released his album Blue Wicked on Elcaset, along with several other older formats, including MiniDisc, Digital Compact Cassette, and Compact Cassette.

== Specifications ==
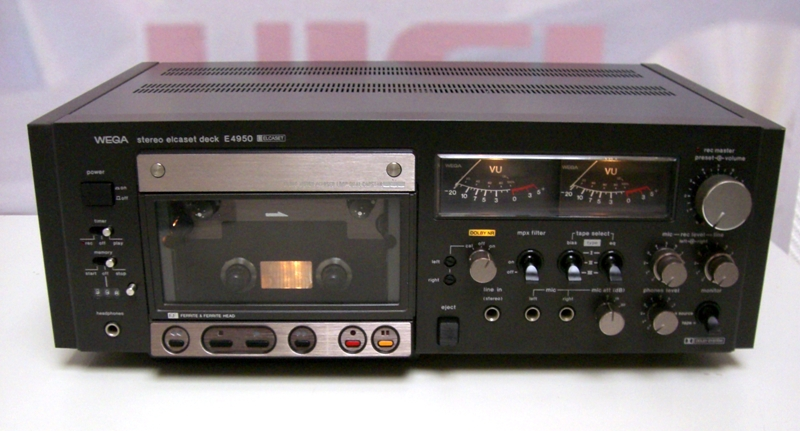
Elcaset recorder released by Sony under the WEGA brand

The cassette itself looks similar to a compact cassette, only larger—about twice the size. Like the earlier RCA tape cartridge, it contained 1/4 inch (6.4 mm) tape running at 3 3/4 inches per second (9.5 cm/s), twice the width and twice the speed of a compact cassette, providing greater frequency response and dynamic range with lower high-frequency noise than the compact cassette. Another notable difference from compact cassettes is that the tape is withdrawn from the cassette when run through the transport mechanism so that the manufacturing tolerances of the cassette shell will not affect sound quality. The top-of-the-line Elcaset decks also have all the features of deluxe open-reel decks, such as separate heads for erasing, recording, and playback; remote control, and heavy-duty transports for low wow & flutter.

== See also ==
- RCA tape cartridge
