= Sabamobil =

Audio tape format

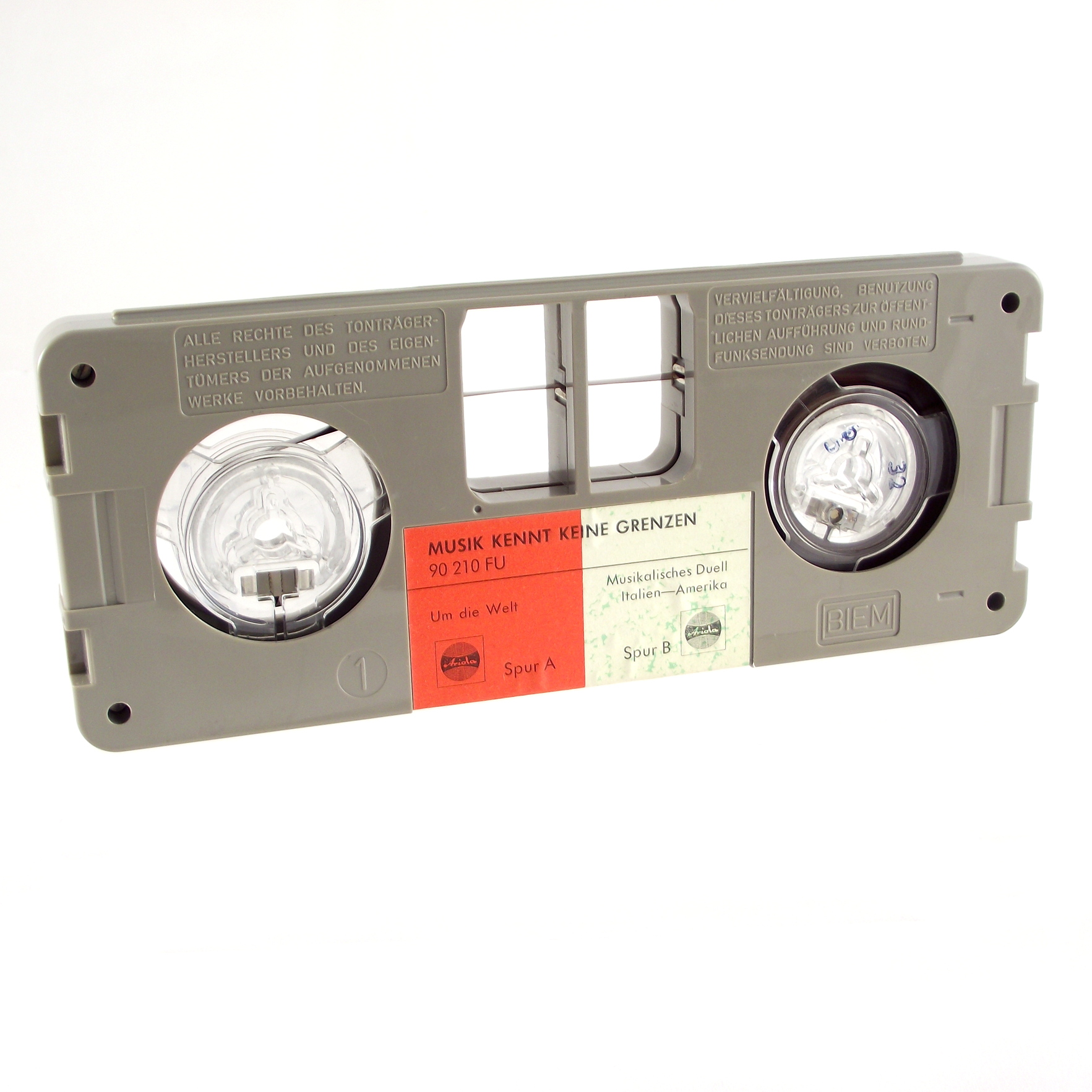
Sabamobil tape cartridge

Sabamobil was a magnetic tape audio cartridge format made by SABA that came to the market in 1964. It used already-available four-track ¼ inch tape on 3-inch reels (7.62 cm), with two mono channels per side, using a tape speed of 3¾ ips (9.5 cm/s), and was compatible with reel-to-reel audio tape recording except the against remove secured ends of the tape in the reel. The cartridge could be opened without the need of any tools by removing two holding clamps. Tape head and capstan were placed between the reels.

In the US, the player was offered for US$136 (equivalent to $1379 in 2024), a cassette was US$14 (equivalent to $142 in 2024), and the adapter for installation in car was US$45 (equivalent to $456 in 2024). The model TK-R12 also had an builtin medium frequency AM-broadcast receiver and could also be operated portable with five D-type batteries. The drive assembly had no drive belts. It appeared in the following year of the introduction of the Compact Cassette and lost its market shares soon to 8-track and Compact Cassette, which both came in smaller cartridges.

A similar technique to reuse standard 3-inch reels was the design of the dictation machine Philips Norelco EL3581, but with rearranged tracks and slower tape speed.
