= RCA tape cartridge =

Magnetic tape audio format introduced in 1958

RCA Sound Tape Cartridge
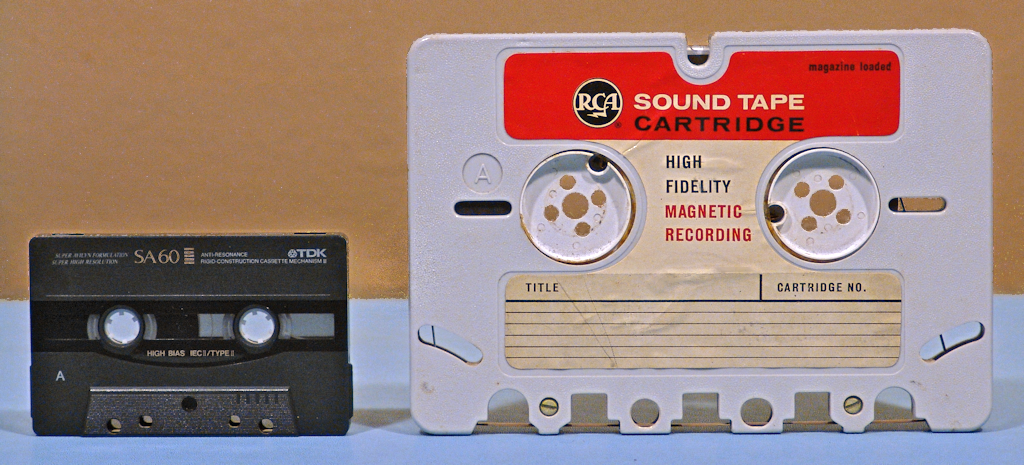
- Size comparison of RCA tape cartridge (right) with the more common Compact Cassette
- Media type: Magnetic cassette tape
- Encoding: Analog
- Capacity: 30 min per side, two sided
- Developed by: RCA
- Dimensions: 5 × 7.125 × 0.5 inches (137 × 197 × 13 mm)
- Usage: Home audio recording
- Released: 1958
- Discontinued: 1964

The RCA tape cartridge (labeled the RCA Sound Tape Cartridge) is a magnetic tape audio format that was designed to offer stereo quarter-inch reel-to-reel tape recording quality in a convenient format for the consumer market. It was introduced in 1958, following four years of development. This timing coincided with the launch of the stereophonic phonograph record.

== Specifications ==
The main advantage of the RCA tape cartridge over reel-to-reel machines is convenience. The user is not required to handle unruly tape ends and thread the tape through the machine before use, making the medium of magnetic tape more friendly to casual users. In addition, since the cartridge carries both supply and take-up reels, the cartridge does not have to be rewound before the tape is removed from the machine and stored. Because of these conveniences, the RCA tape cartridge system did see some success in schools, particularly in student language learning labs.

The same design concept would later be used in the more successful Compact Cassette, introduced by Philips in 1963. Similar to the Compact Cassette, the RCA cartridges are reversible so that either side can be played. An auto-reverse mechanism in some models allows the tape to run continuously. Equal to 8-track tape and Stereo-Pak, the tape runs at a standard speed of 3.75 inches per second (IPS). This is double the speed of the Compact Cassette and half of the top speed of consumer reel-to-reel tape recorders, which usually offer both 3.75 IPS and 7.5 IPS speeds. Such consumer reel-to-reel machines are capable of superior audio performance, but only at the faster speed.

The RCA tape cartridge format offers four discrete audio tracks that provide a typical playtime of 30 minutes of stereo sound per side, or double that for monophonic sound. Some models can also play and record at 1.875 IPS, doubling playing time with a significant reduction in sound quality. This speed was of too low quality for music on these machines, but was acceptable for voice recording.

With two interleaved stereo pairs, the track format and speed of the RCA tape cartridge is the same as that of consumer reel-to-reel stereo tape recorders, which run at 3.75 IPS. It is possible to dismantle the cartridge, spool the tape onto an open reel, and play it on such a machine. In fact, RCA offered an adapter for their Sound Tape Cartridge machines to enable them to both play back and record traditional reels of tape up to 5 inches in reel diameter.

Unlike the Compact Cassette, the RCA tape cartridge incorporates a brake to prevent the tape hubs from moving when the cartridge is not in a player. Small slot windows extend from the tape hubs toward the outside of the cartridge so that the amount of tape visible on each spool can be seen.

== Legacy ==
Despite its convenience, the RCA tape cartridge was not much of a success. RCA was slow to produce machines for the home market. They were also slow to license pre-recorded music tapes for home playback. Cost was also an issue, with a single cartridge costing US$4.50 in 1960 ($49 with inflation today) compared to a 1,200 foot (365 m) reel of tape, which cost $3.50 ($38 today). The format was advertised nationally by RCA as late as fall 1964 and was continued into model year 1965 production.

The physical tape width and speed of the tape and even the size of the RCA tape cartridge is similar to, though incompatible with, Sony's Elcaset system, introduced in 1976. That system also failed to achieve much market acceptance and was soon withdrawn.
