= Cassette (format) =

Form of physical media

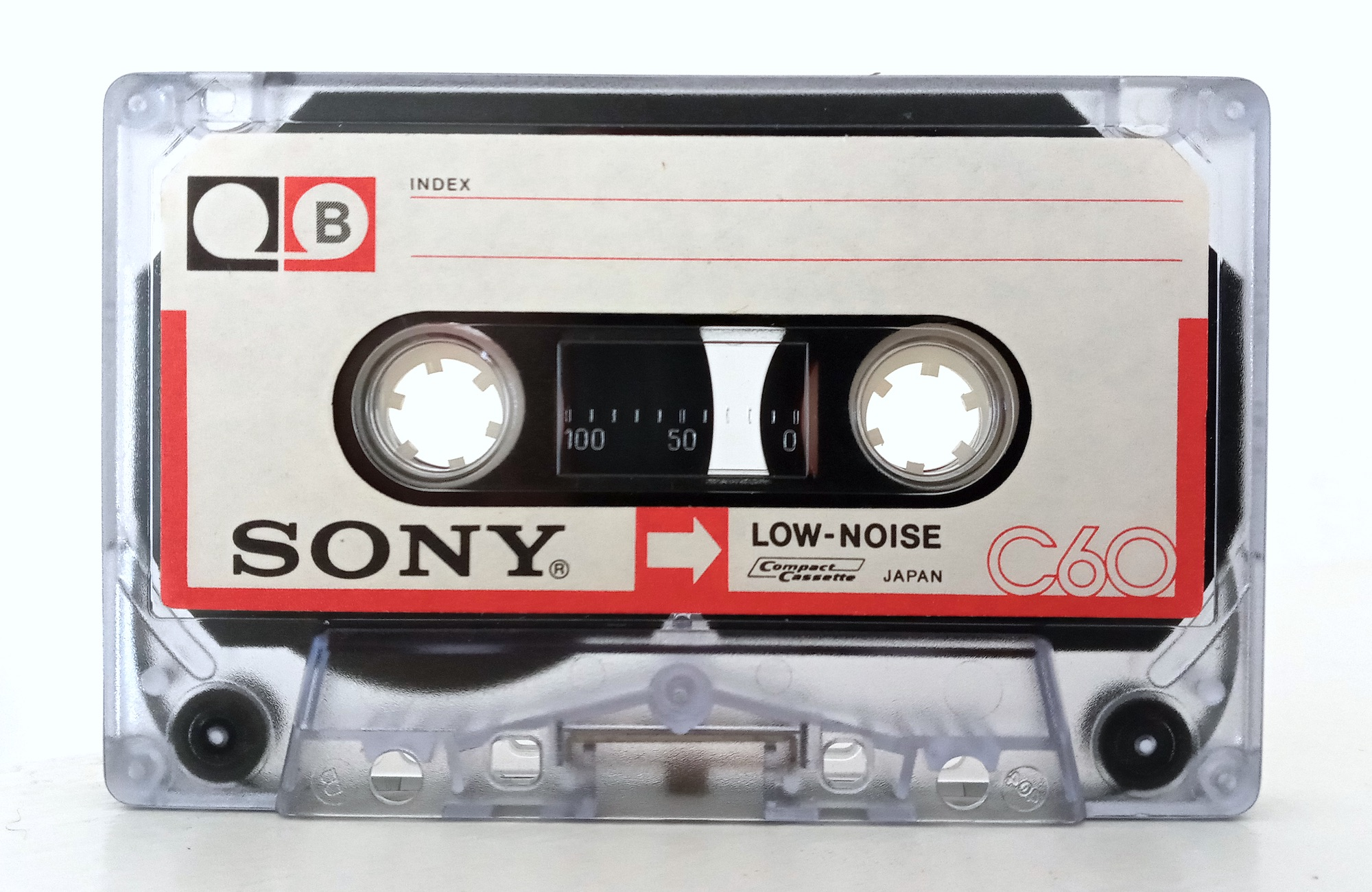
A Sony Compact Cassette

A cassette is a small plastic unit containing a length of magnetic tape on two reels. The design was created to replicate the way a reel-to-reel machine works with tape moving from one reel to another while being read by a tape head. The design was first made for audio formats but then expanded into video and data storage.

As of 2025, although the cassette format is no longer used for video or data storage, it is still used as an audio format with many consumers still purchasing new album releases on cassette.

== Terminology ==
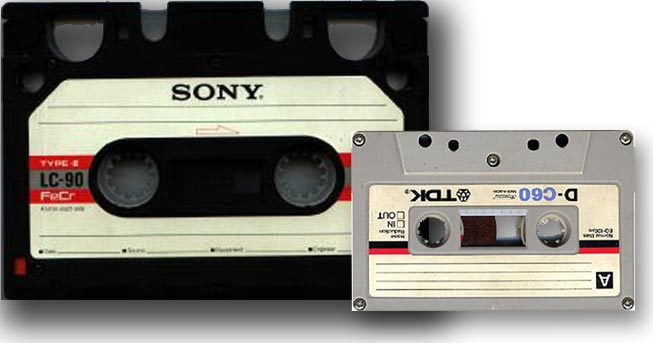
Two examples of audiocassettes. Elcaset on the left next to a Compact Cassette on the right.

The term cassette refers to an enclosed tape unit with two reels, while cartridge and tape cartridge refer to units that contain a single reel of tape. Historically, the terms were used more interchangeably, and early enclosed tape systems such as the RCA tape cartridge used two reels.

== History ==
Magnetic tape became a popular method to record and play back audio and video recordings with reel-to-reel machines being used for audio with audiotape and videotape becoming an easier way for TV stations to broadcast TV shows and record news programs. The medium served as an easier way to preserve and store media as well as play it back that didn't come with the hassle of something like vinyl or setting up film projectors for home use or having to deal with satellite interruptions for broadcasts of video for TV stations.

Over time, magnetic tape became the main way that media was stored and accessed. As the format became more ubiquitous, the hassle and difficulty of managing reels of tape for both consumers and professionals became evident even when the reels came in smaller, portable sizes. Many companies tried to come up with a method of storing the tape in an easier format. This led to the creation of magnetic tape stored in cases known as "tape cartridges". Many of these cartridges would house the tape inside on a single reel with the tape either being exposed on one side so the tape head could read it like 8-track cartridge or have a mechanical system that would pull out the tape to read it like Video Cassette Recording by Philips.

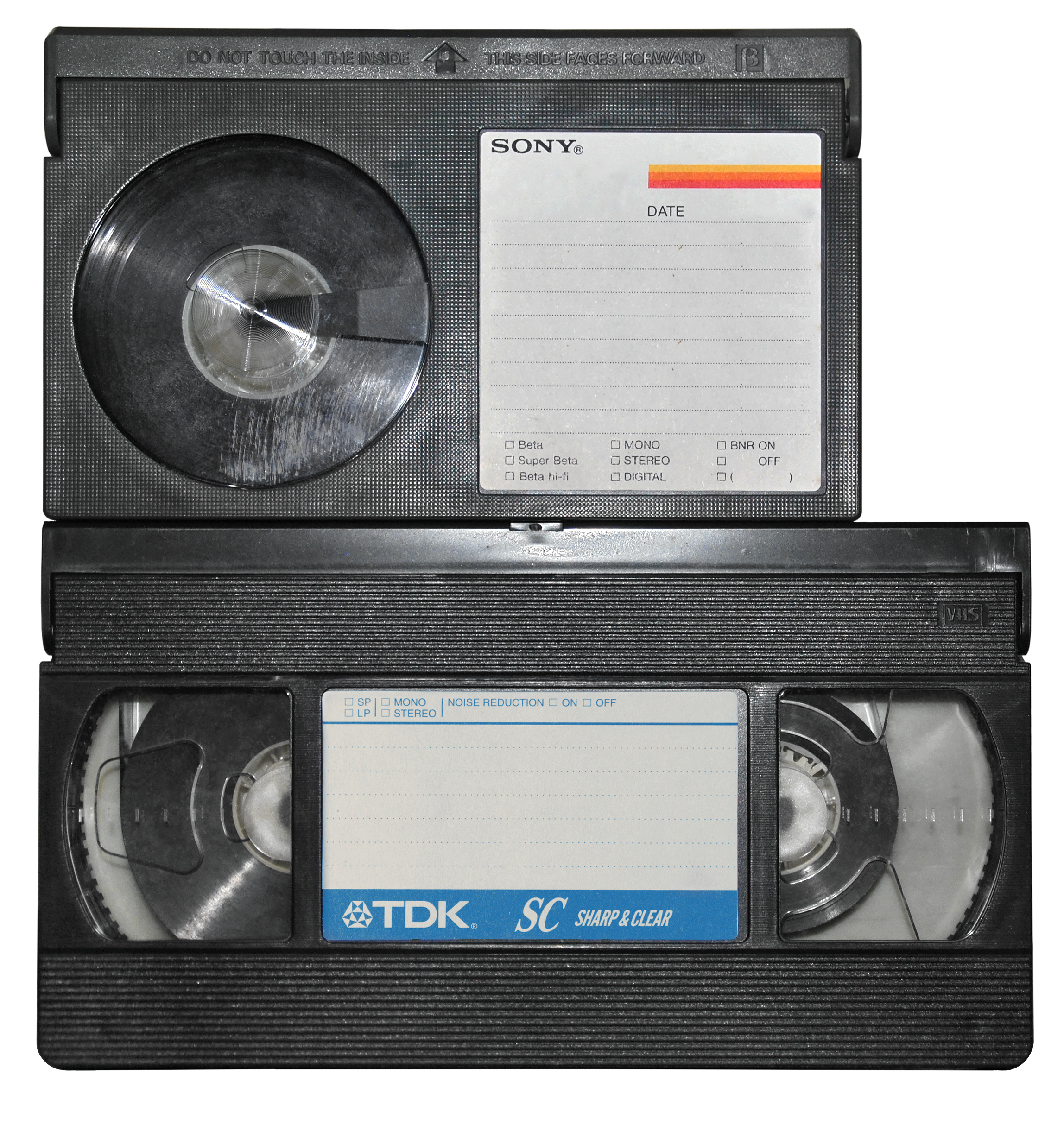
Betamax videocassette on the top and a VHS videocassette on the bottom

RCA then introduced the RCA tape cartridge in 1958, an audio format which worked similarly to a traditional reel-to-reel machine but instead of providing the tape in one big reel, the tape came enclosed in a case that had two reels built into it that would run the tape from either side. This would remove the hassle of setting up a reel-to-reel deck and winding up the tape to the other side of a machine in order to play it. It also allowed a more reliable way to play back the tape instead of the single reel system other cartridges used. It wouldn't be until 1963 with the introduction of Compact Cassette that this dual reel system would become the standard and also introduce the term cassette for these cases. The term "cassette" came from French which meant "little case". This would then be followed by video formats with U-matic becoming a standard for video broadcast on the professional, TV segment and VHS for consumer, home video.

== See also ==
- Audiotape
- Computer data storage
- Data proliferation
- Digital cassettes
- Information repository
- Linear Tape-Open
- List of tape cartridge and cassette formats
- Magnetic storage
- Tape cartridge
- Tape drive
- Tape mark
- Videotape
