= Analog recording =

Category of techniques that allow later playback of analog signals

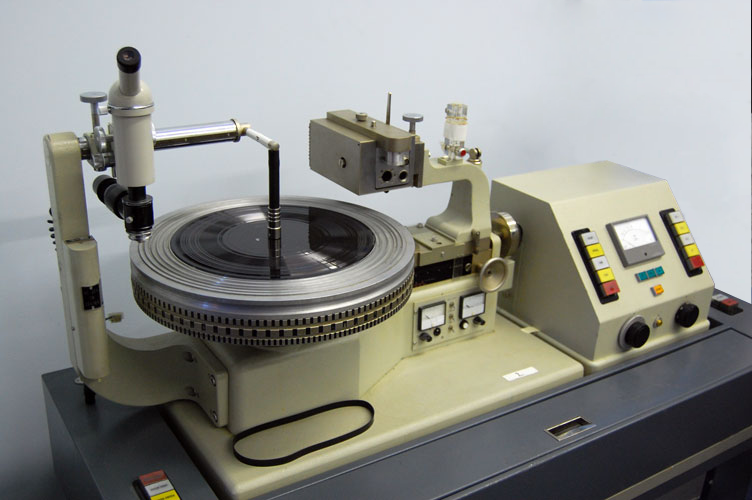
Neumann Sound Engraver VMS-70

Analog recording is a category of techniques used for the recording of analog signals. This enables later playback of the recorded analog audio.

Analog audio recording began with mechanical systems such as the phonautograph and phonograph. Later, electronic techniques such as wire and tape recording were developed.

Analog recording methods store analog signals directly in or on the media. The signal may be stored as a physical texture on a phonograph record, or a fluctuation in the field strength of a magnetic recording. Analog transmission methods use analog signals to distribute audio content. These are in contrast to digital audio where an analog signal is sampled and quantized to produce a digital signal which is represented, stored and transmitted as discrete numbers.

== See also ==
- Comparison of analog and digital recording
- History of sound recording
- Timeline of audio formats
