= Aluminum disc =

Analog recording disc used mainly for early radio recordings

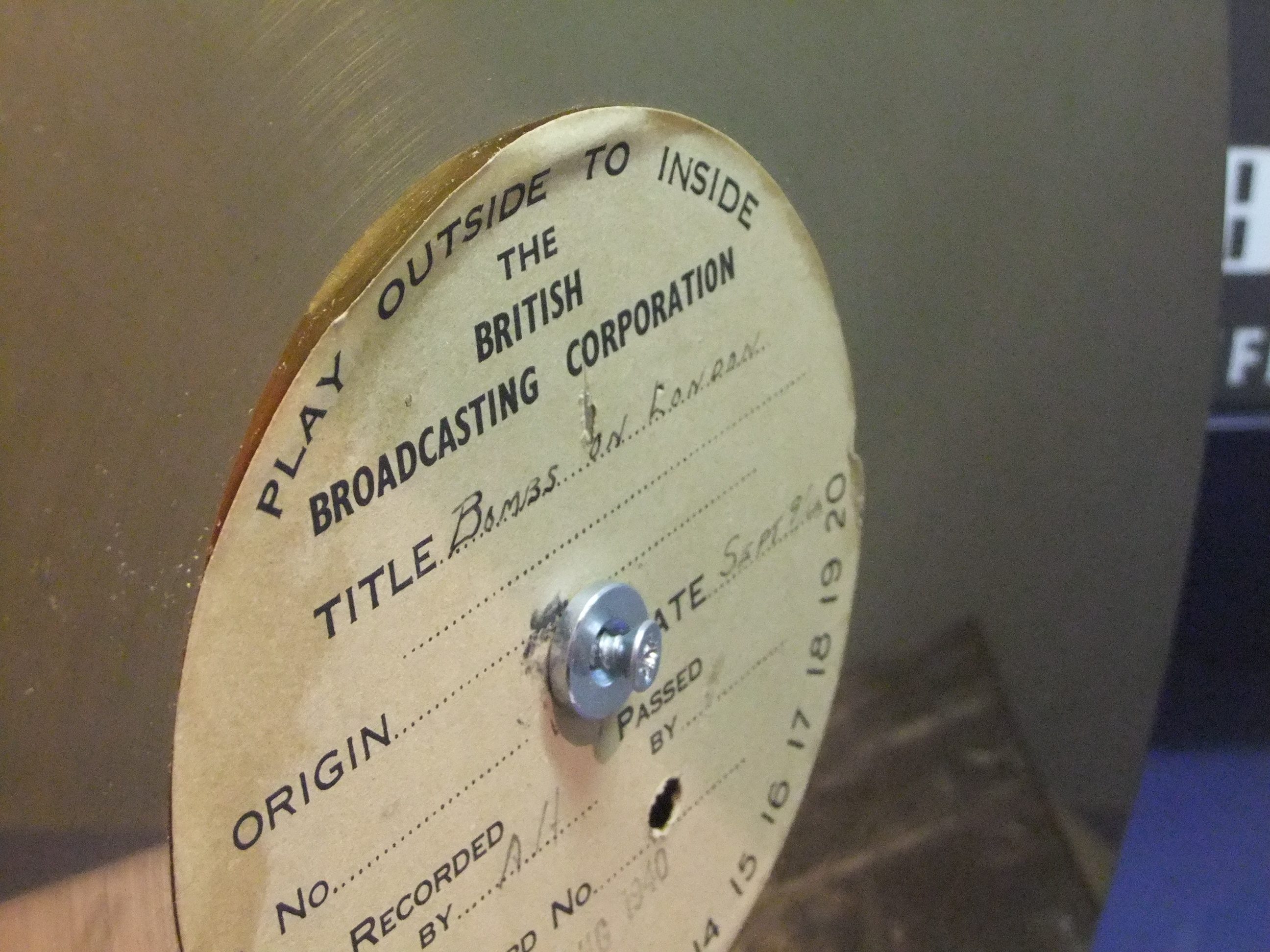
Bombs on London recorded on an aluminum disc by the British Broadcasting Corporation in 1940 on display at the CBC Museum

In the field of audio recording, an aluminum disc (aluminium in the UK and elsewhere) is a phonograph (gramophone in the UK) record made of bare aluminum, a medium introduced in the late 1920s for making one-off recordings. Although sometimes used for making amateur studio or home recordings or in coin-operated "record-your-voice" booths at fairs and arcades, during the first half of the 1930s bare aluminum discs were primarily used to record radio broadcasts for the private transcription disc archives of performers or sponsors.

== Process ==
In the recording process, a sufficiently amplified audio signal is sent to a recording head consisting of a blunt diamond stylus attached to an electromagnetic transducer; this assembly is then mounted to a heavily weighted arm designed to allow linear movement of the recording head above and across the disc while also maintaining firm contact between the stylus and the disc’s surface.

In one form of this recording method, a completely blank disc is used and the recording head is guided on its path toward the disc’s center by a dedicated fixed-pitch feed mechanism. Some lower-end recording units economize their design by eliminating the feed mechanism, instead relying on discs pre-cut with a narrow, blank spiral groove running the full surface of the recording area. As the disc rotates, the stylus follows the pre-cut path, impressing its vibrations into the relatively quiet upper region of the groove while leaving the comparatively noisy bottom portion of the groove blank. This cost-cutting approach produces recordings with very limited dynamic range and generally poor sound quality. In either case, high-frequency signal content is heavily attenuated, while the grain structure of the metal and its natural resistance to the side-to-side motions of the recording stylus impose significant surface noise on recorded material.

While superficially similar to the method by which a record cutter engraves an acetate disc or vinyl master, the aluminum disc recording process does not involve removing any material from the disc’s surface. Instead, as the rotating disc passes under the recording head, the sound-modulated vibration of the stylus is embossed into the groove, forming indentations directly upon the metal. Aluminum discs are both recorded and played starting from their outer edge, with the stylus following the tight spiral path of the groove toward the disc’s center.

Subsequent vertically-modulated versions fared better acoustically, however their incompatibility with standard home phonographs of the period led to these designs being discontinued in the marketplace fairly rapidly.

== Playing the recordings ==
The recording had to be played back with a fiber needle such as cut and pointed bamboo or a plant thorn, as an ordinary steel needle in a typical heavy pickup would severely damage the soft aluminum surface. Even when playing a bare aluminium disc with a modern lightweight magnetic cartridge, a hard stylus that does not correctly fit the contour of the groove will score its surface and tend to skip and repeat, damaging the disc as well as degrading the quality of the recovered audio. Because the blunt recording stylus typically bore down on the aluminum at a substantial angle, it produced a disproportionately shallow groove, so that optimum playback with modern equipment requires a custom stylus with an unusually large tip radius.

== Acetate discs and further development ==
In 1934, the Pyral Company in France and the Presto Recording Corporation in the United States independently created the so-called acetate disc by coating a layer of nitrocellulose lacquer onto the aluminum, which now served only as a rigid support. The difference here is, rather than embossing the audio, the signal was engraving the groove onto an easily cut and grainless lacquer. This made it possible to produce a broadcast-quality recording that preserved high-frequency detail and was nearly noiseless when new. As a result, professional recording services soon abandoned the use of bare aluminum blanks, although some amateur and novelty use persisted into the 1940s.

Combinations of the two technologies addressed above involved embossing onto a soft resin-based blank with no metal or fiber substrate. Made chiefly for the emerging dictation market during World War II, the two most well known are the SoundScriber (vertical modulation) and the Gray Audograph, the latter of which, along with the CGS Rieber unit, recorded in an inches-per-second Constant Linear Velocity mode (like the modern CD/DVD - starting off faster in the center and gradually getting slower as the disc progressed towards the edge instead of recording in revolutions-per-minute. Memovox machines, like the SoundScriber recorded in a RPM type format. Cylindrical versions such as the Dictabelt applied the same technology to resin-based loops to get around the decrease of fidelity from the outside to the inside of the disc when recording in RPM/Constant Angular Velocity.

== Use in archival work ==
From an archival perspective, the changeover traded long-term stability for superior sound quality. A bare aluminum disc can remain unchanged indefinitely if carefully stored, while the coating on a lacquer disc or the entirety of a resin-based disc is subject to chemical deterioration, tending to shrink and become brittle due to the loss of unstable plasticizers the same as with celluloid film, which can cause the lacquer or acetate to develop cracks, split off from the aluminum base disc, and in severe cases disintegrate into an unsalvageable rubble of tiny flakes.

== Scrap and survivals ==
Most recordings on bare aluminum are believed to have perished in the scrap metal drives held during World War II. Aluminum was declared to be a critical war material and civilians in the US were urged to do their patriotic duty by finding and turning in anything made of it. The collected "scrap" was melted and recycled.

A selection of recently found EKCO aluminium discs containing home recordings of BBC radio broadcasts from 1932 to 1937 which escaped the above fate may be seen and heard at http://www.greenbank-records.com

== Other fields ==
In other fields, aluminum disc may refer to the aluminum core discs used for the "platters" in hard disk drives, or to discs used in various other products or manufacturing processes.

== See also ==
- Acetate disc
