= Speech Processing Solutions =

Manufacturer of speech processing devices

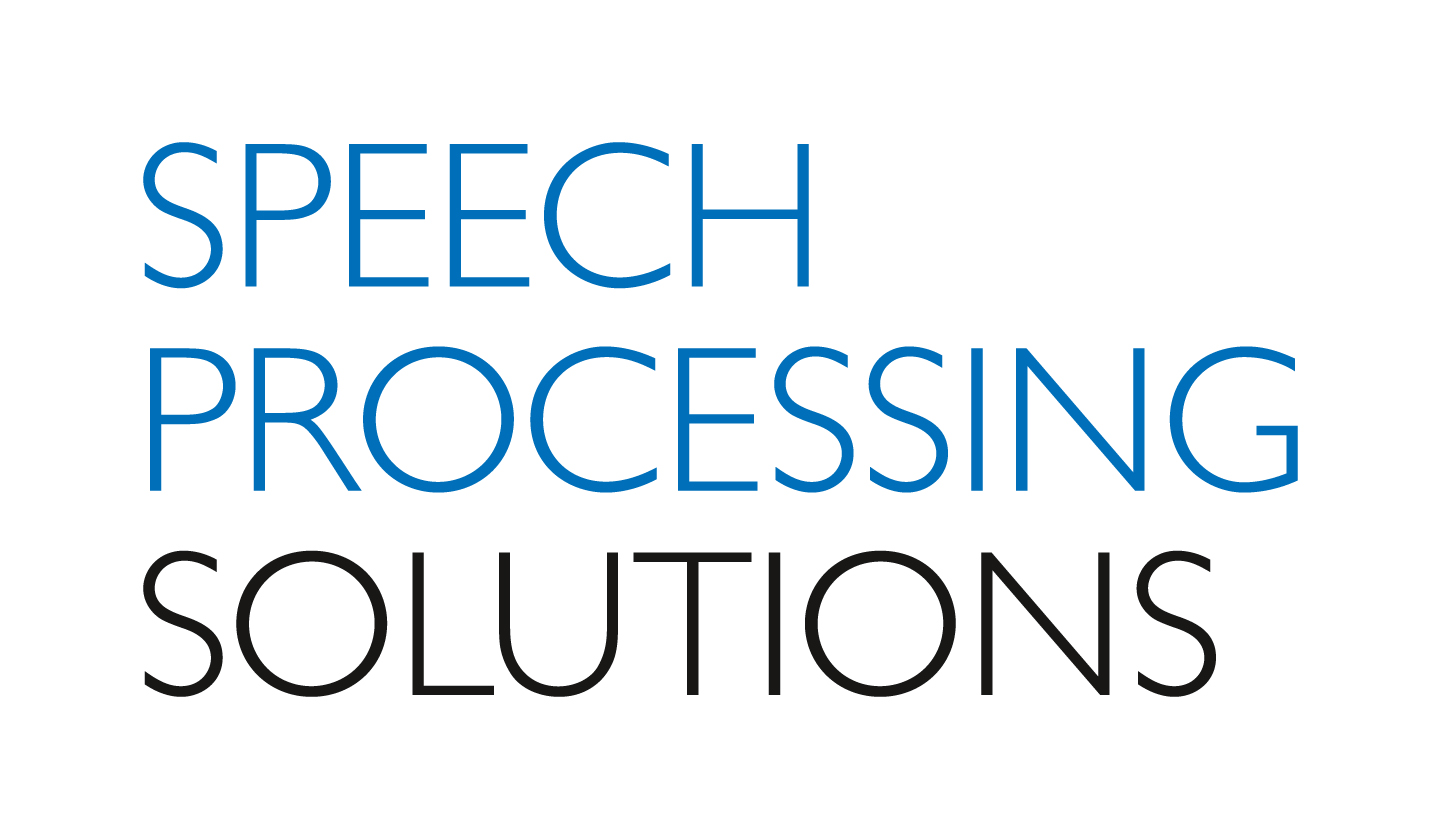
- Industry: Electronics
- Predecessor: Philips Speech Processing
- Headquarters: Vienna, Austria
- Area served: Worldwide
- Key people: Thomas Brauner (President and CEO)
- Products: Speech processing devices
- Owner: Invest AG
- Number of employees: ~170

Speech Processing Solutions is an international electronics company headquartered in Vienna, Austria. The company designs, develops, manufactures and markets speech processing devices, such as those used in digital dictation and speech recognition. Speech Processing Solutions was formed on 1 July 2012. Philips Speech Processing was part of the Philips Consumer Lifestyle sector. Speech Processing Solutions is now an official licensee of the Philips brand. The company has subsidiaries in the US, Canada, Australia, the United Kingdom, Belgium, France and Germany, and employs around 170 people worldwide.

== History ==
Philips Speech Processing was founded in 1954, when the first dictation machine was produced in Vienna. In 1957, the first cassette-based dictation machine followed. One of the company's achievements was the development of the Mini-Cassette (also referred to as minicassette) in 1967. The Mini-Cassette had a tape cassette format, mainly for the use with dictation recorders, which is still today's standard in professional analog dictation. The cassettes were subsequently used in the Philips Pocket Memo devices, which were launched in the same year.

In 1989, Philips Speech Processing was awarded the ISO 9000 certification for quality assurance. At the time, the company was the first to receive such a distinction in Austria. 1991 marked the launch of Voice System 4000, which became a standard for hospitals worldwide. In 1994 Philips Speech Processing won the IF Design Award for their Pocket Memo 293. In 1995 the company developed SpeechNote, a dictation and transcription software.

In 1996, Philips, Grundig, and Olympus established the International Voice Association and defined the Digital Speech Standard (DSS), a proprietary compressed digital audio file format. It offers high audio quality for voice recording and is therefore suitable for voice recognition. The format allows files to be stored in a highly compressed form, reducing file size, network traffic, and required storage capacity. The format also allows the user to attach additional information, such as a client or patient name, or a document type number, which is then stored in the file header.

In the same year, Philips Speech Processing also launched their first digital mobile device, the Philips SpeechPad. This was followed in 1998 by the launch of SpeechMike, the first digital dictation microphone with PC navigation and the introduction of SpeechMike Executive software. In 2002, Philips Speech Processing received a Lyreco Award for Best Supplier in Dictation Products, followed by the Merkur Award for Innovations from the Austrian Chamber of Commerce in 2003. The firm also launched their new range of dictation devices aimed at the consumer market in that year, the Digital Voice Tracers.

In 2004 the company launched the Digital Pocket Memo 9450 VC, at the time the first handheld dictation recorder with integrated voice commands, and received the IF Design Award for it in 2005. In 2004 Philips also introduced the first clip-on barcode module scanner for digital mobile devices. Philips also created the new SpeechExec software, a solution aimed at professional users, providing them with a full dictation workflow package.

In 2008 Philips sold the related division Speech Recognition Systems to Nuance Communications.

In 2009 Philips Speech Processing launched their first wireless desktop dictation device, the SpeechMike Air, as well as a dictation solution for mobile phones.

2012 Philips sold its Speech Processing unit to Invest AG, the private equity arm of Raiffeisen Banking Group Upper Austria.

In the same year Speech Processing Solutions introduced its new stationary digital dictation device, the SpeechMike Premium, with integrated motion sensor and antimicrobial surface. Also the Philips dictation recorder app for smartphones (iPhone, Android and BlackBerry) was launched.

The latest product innovation from Speech Processing Solutions came in 2013, the launch of the Pocket Memo 8000 series. Nuance awarded the Digital Pocket Memo (DPM) 8000 series with the highest Dragon Score (6 out of 6).

In 2014 Speech Processing Solutions introduced its new cloud software called SpeechLive. It is a cloud-based workflow solution dedicated to dictation.

== Products ==
The company's core businesses are in hardware and software related to speech processing solutions. Its products include:

- Philips SpeechMike USB dictation microphone
- Philips Pocket Memo voice recorder
- Philips SpeechExec dictation workflow software
- Philips Voice Tracer digital voice recorder
- Philips dictation recorder app
- Philips SpeechLive cloud dictation solution
