= Grundig Business Systems =

- Company type: GmbH
- Industry: Office equipment
- Founded: 2001
- Headquarters: Bayreuth, Nuremberg, Germany
- Key people: Roland Hollstein, Barbara Kuriczak CEO
- Products: Digital and analogue dictation devices, Speech Recognition, Electronic Manufacturing Services
- Owner: Induc GmbH
- Number of employees: 170
- Website: www.grundig-gbs.com

Grundig Business Systems (GBS) is a German maker of dictation solutions located in Bayreuth and Nuremberg in Germany and employs 170 people. It was spun off from Grundig AG in 2001 to focus on the manufacture of analogue and digital dictation devices featuring the "Made in Germany" label.

== Background ==
The company began in 1954 with the Stenorette A, the first Grundig dictation machine on the market. The Steno-Cassette 30, developed by Grundig in 1983, became the DIN standard. In association with a consortium project of the International Voice Association, the .dss Digital Speech Standard was developed by Grundig in 1995. The dictation machine division became independent from its former parent Grundig under the name of Grundig Business Systems in 2001.

== History ==
The first Grundig dictation device, Stenorette, was launched on the market in 1954. Because of its initial green casing the dictation device was simply called "tree frog" by the workers. Three years later Max Grundig opened the, as he called it, "largest tape recorder factory in the world" in Bayreuth. Since then dictation devices from Grundig Business Systems have been produced at this location. The number of employees in Bayreuth rose to 2,000 in the middle 1960s.

The seventies saw the introduction of the first mini index cassette for dictation devices with integrated tape counter: Steno Cassette 30. Grundig also produced the Stenorette 2002, featuring the first desktop dictation system with the K 30 Steno cassette and the Stenorette SL, a portable dictation system for use both in and out of the office. Both products were manufactured for nearly twenty years.

The Steno-Cassette 30 became the DIN standard (DIN 32750) in 1983.

In the early 1990s, GBS developed the first digital dictation system in the world: PC dictation 2000. For the first time speech information was digitalized and stored on the PC's hard drive. The DSS standard was developed and introduced by Grundig as a joint project of the International Voice Association, comprising Grundig, Olympus and Philips.

In 2001 Grundig AG spun off GBS to create a new company. Since then the Grundig Business Systems GmbH has been operating profitably. Thus it was not affected by the later insolvency of the Grundig Corporation. The first digital dictation device from the Digta brand was launched one year later. In 2003 Grundig Business Systems was acquired by INDUC AG (today: INDUC GmbH). In 2017 the circle of investors was expanded to include VR Equitiypartner.

Afterwards, the Stenorette digital Sd 4240 was launched in 2004, featuring a transcription system processing both analogue and digital dictations. GBS introduced the world’s first RFID scanner for dictation devices in 2005. The Digta 410, the first device of the 400 series, followed one year later. In 2007 the Digta 420 was the world’s first mobile dictation device featuring a colour display. It supports the improved DSSPro voice standard which was developed under the auspices of GBS. The Digta CordEx, the world’s first wireless dictation microphone for professional use, was presented by GBS in 2008. For this product GBS was awarded the Innovation Prize IT 2009 at the CeBIT trade show in Hanover in March 2009.

In 2011, Grundig Business Systems introduced a new generation of mobile digital dictation products: the "Digta 7" product line.

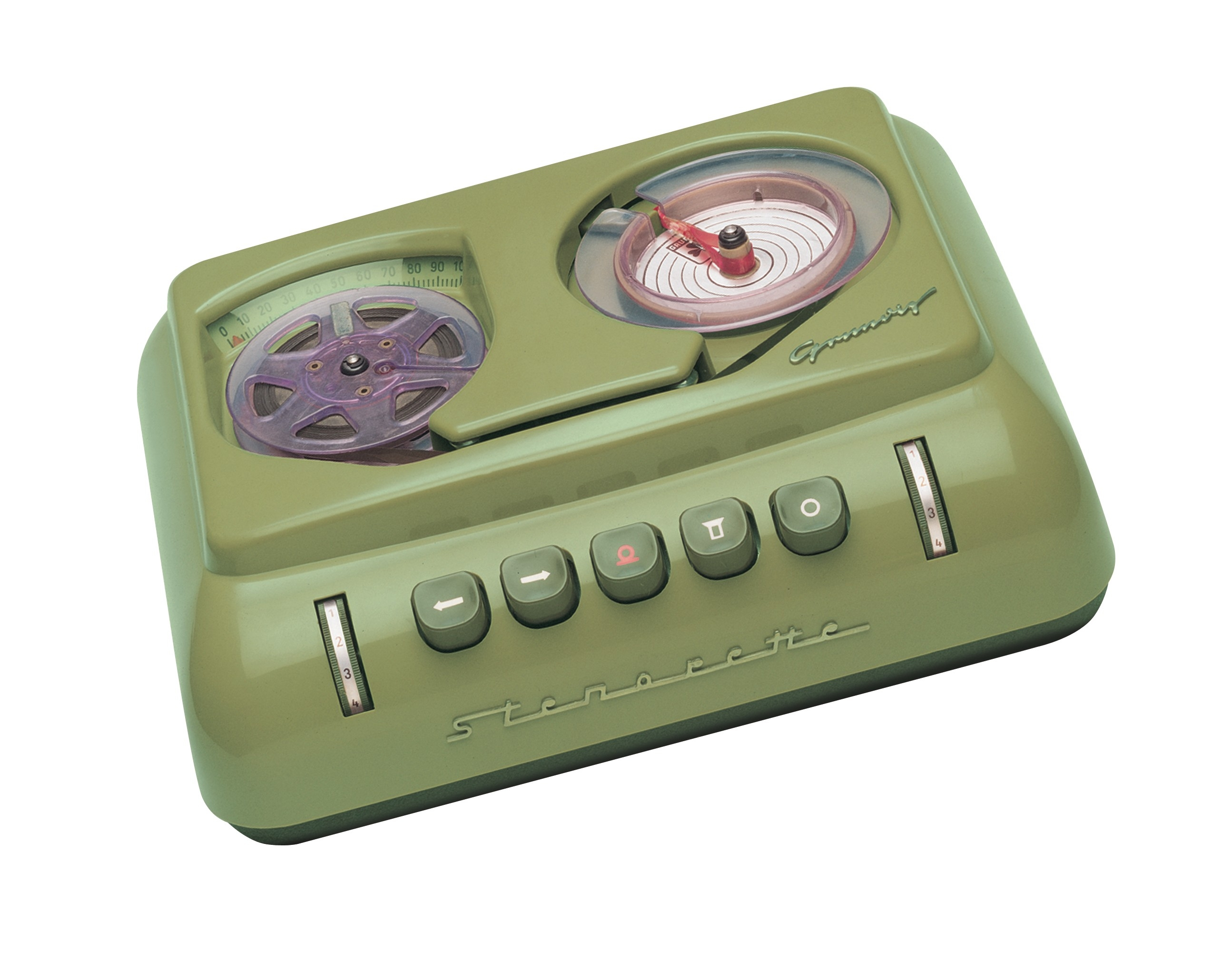
The first Stenorette from the year 1954 - called "tree frog"

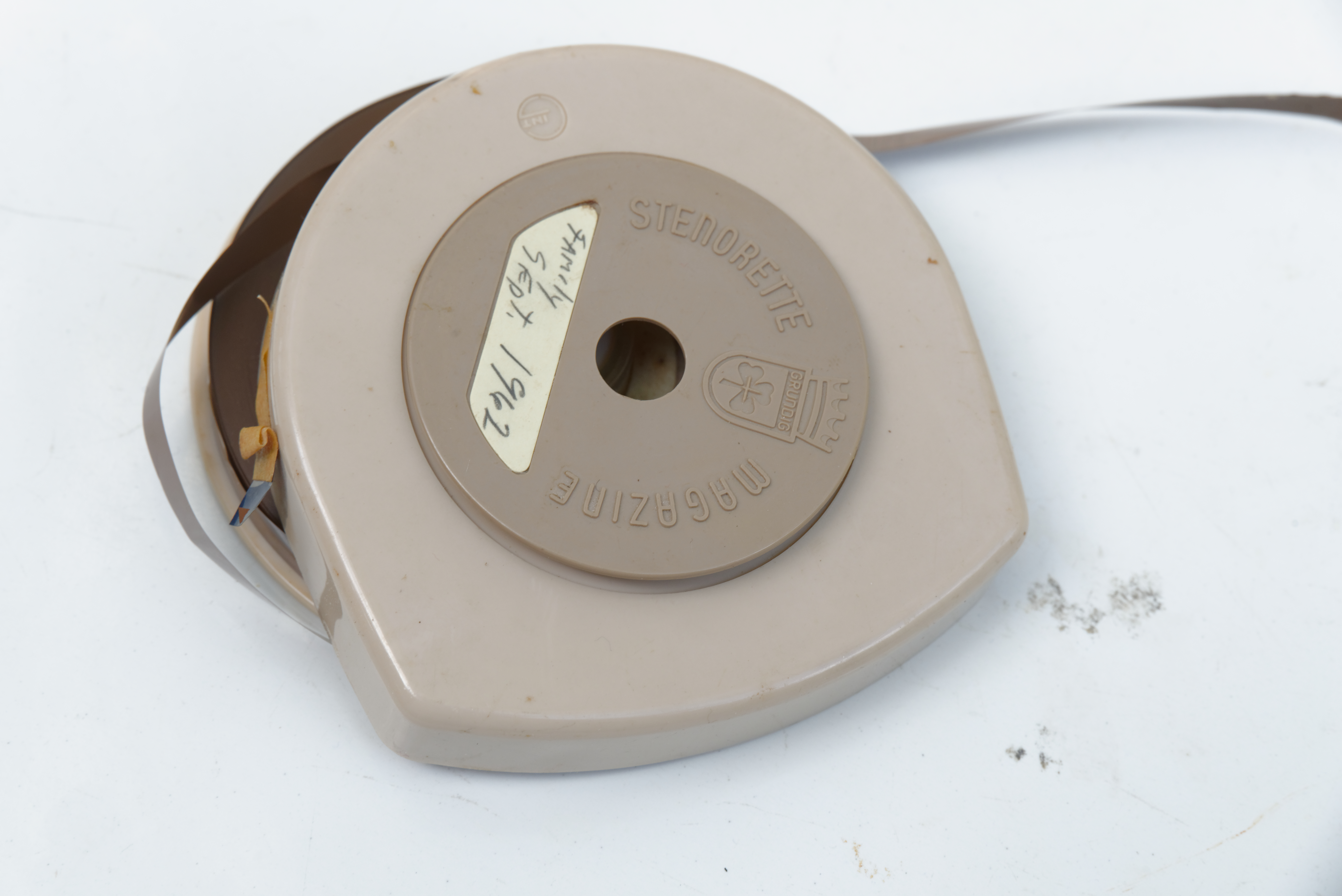
An open Stenorette magazine, ca. 1960

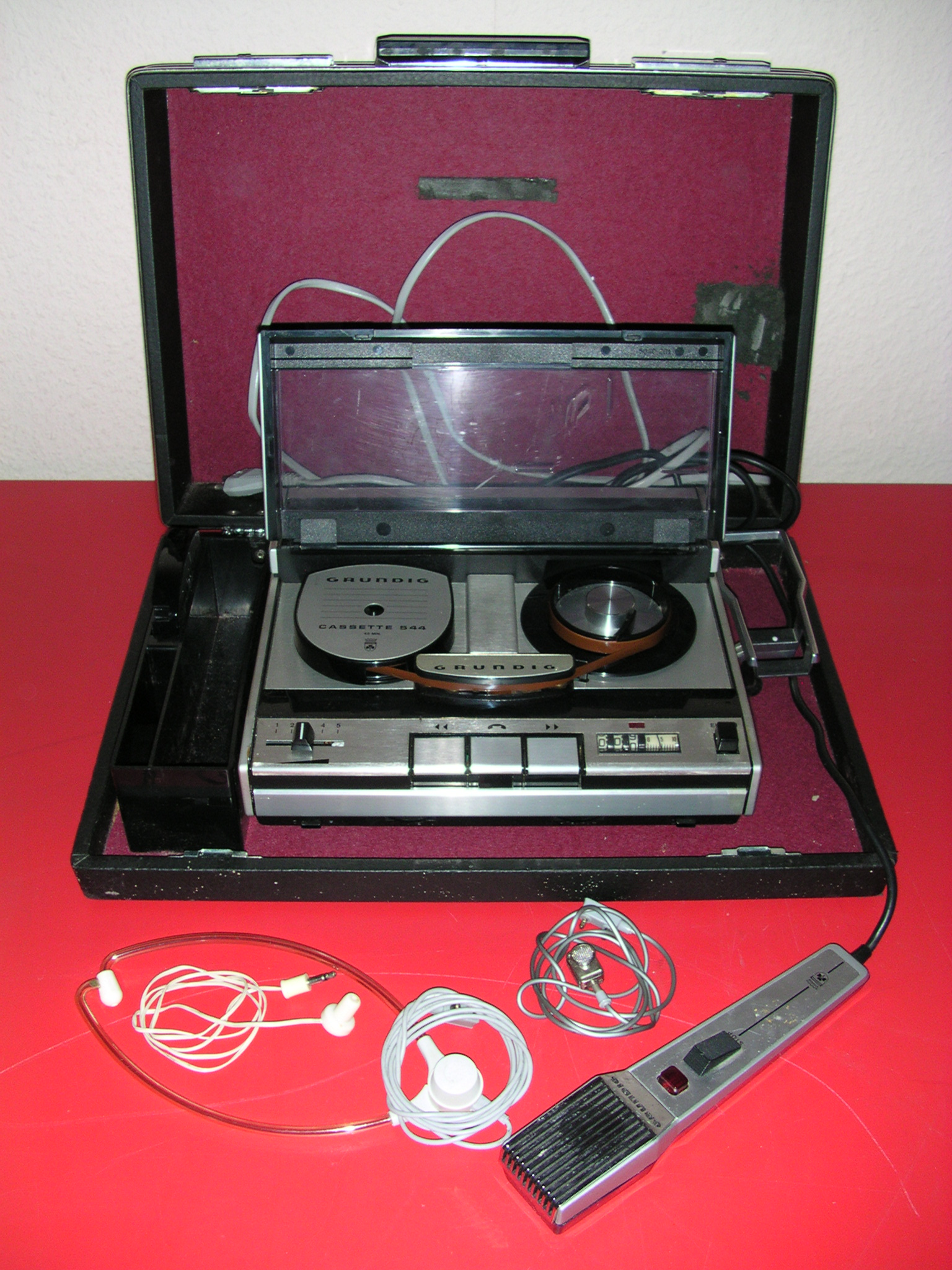
Stenorette SL in a case

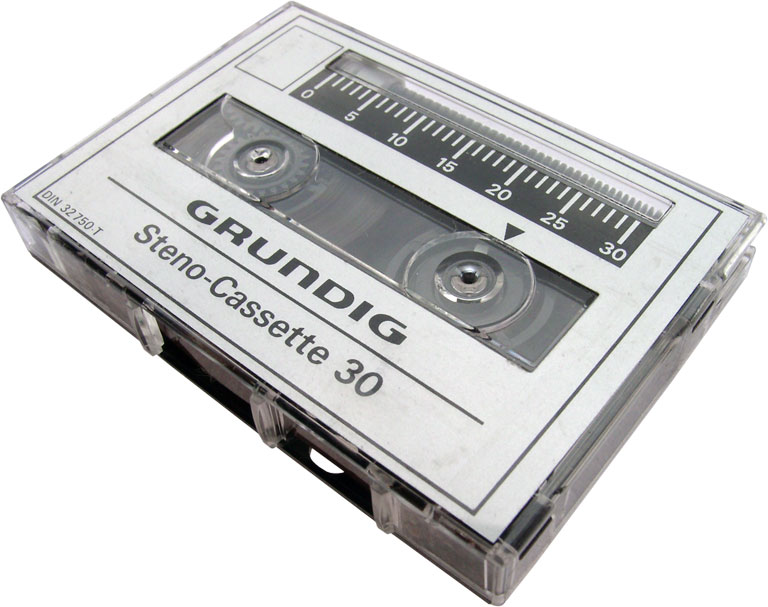
Steno-Cassette 30

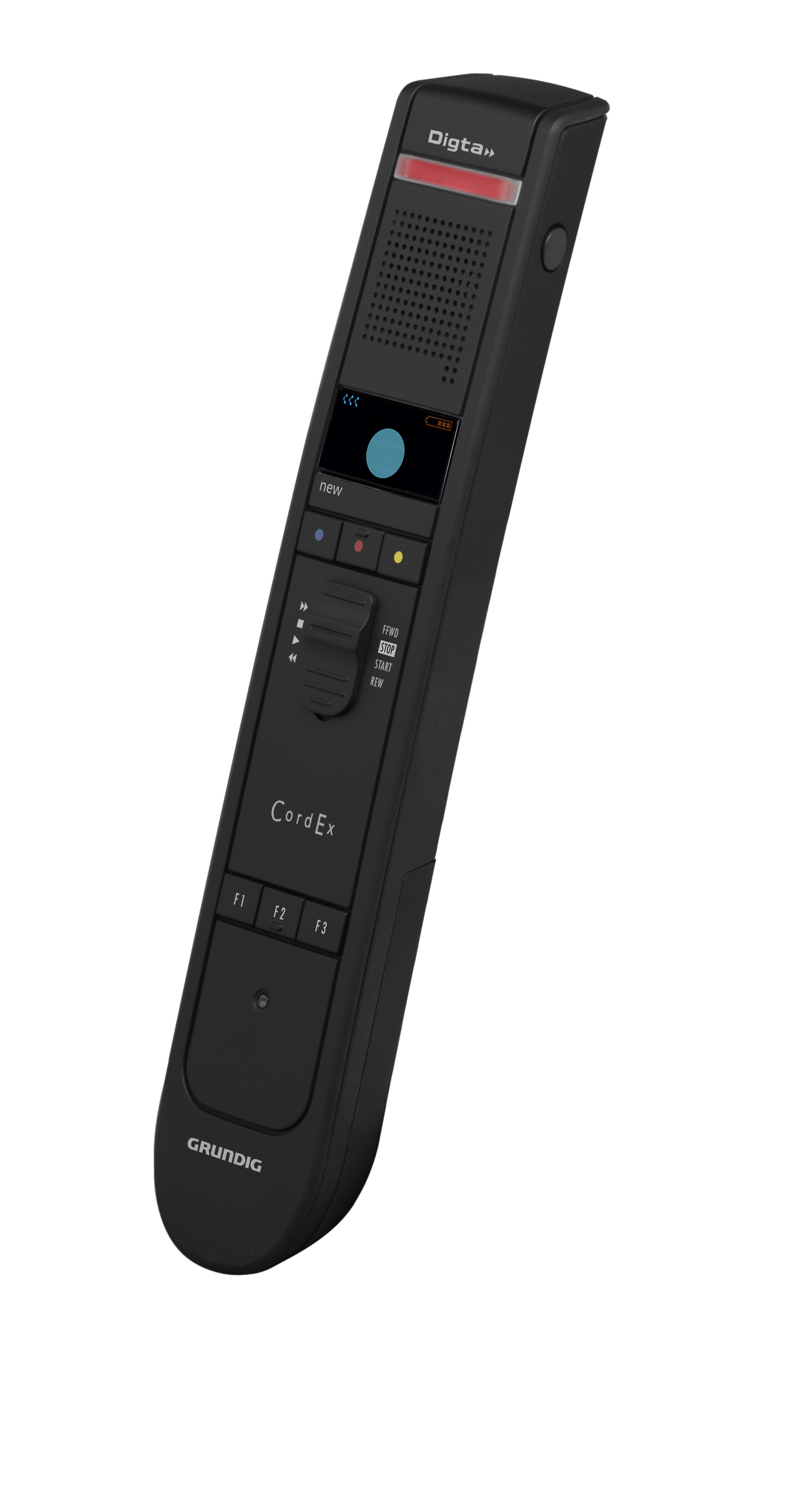
Digta CordEx

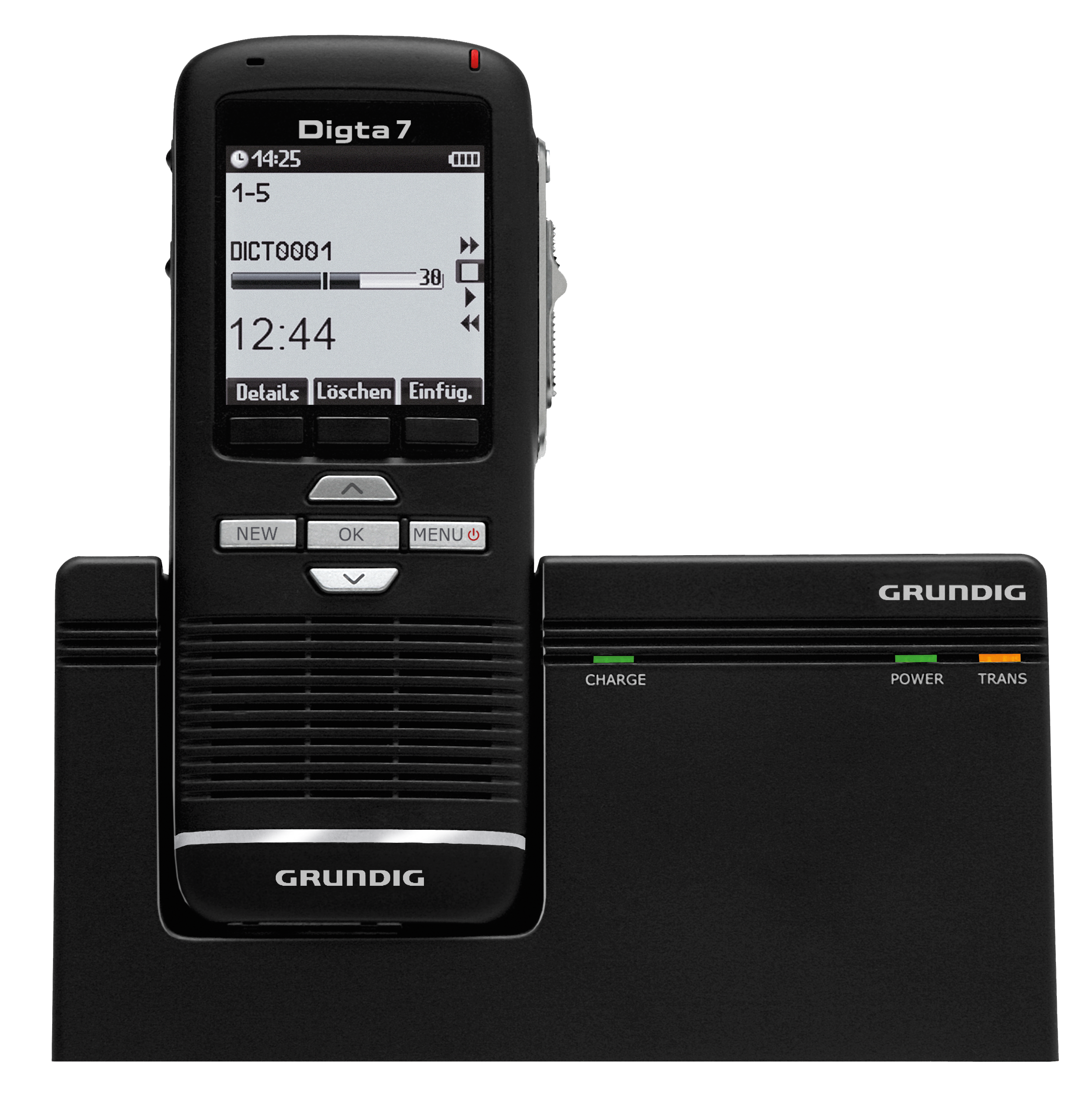
Digta 7 with the Digta Station 447 Plus
