= Samsung Miniket =

Line of camcorders

- Manufacturer: Samsung Electronics
- Rear camera: SVGA

The Samsung Miniket was a line of multifunction camcorders sold from March 2005 through mid-2007. Each device in this line functions as a video camera, digital camera, webcam, MP3 player, voice recorder, and external storage. Some models had up to 2GB of internal storage and made use of external formats for more storage, with some camcorders in the line using MMC, SD cards or Memory Stick PRO. Higher end models had up to 2.11 megapixel sensors. Certain camcorders in the lineup were made for sports and contained extra accessories and features, like the ability to record from an external camera. Models weigh as little as 147 grams.
