= Pyral =

French recording medium manufacturer

Current logo of Pyral

Pyral SAS is a manufacturer of magnetic recording media products, based in Avranches, France. As of 2015, it is a subsidiary of Mulann, a French company in the smartcard and ticketing industry.

In 1934, Pyral created a new type of transcription disc. Their innovation was to coat the aluminum disc with a layer of lacquer. These discs came to be known as lacquers or acetates.

As of 2007, the company's primary product is perforated magnetic tape, used to record sound for movie productions. They also produce magnetic inks and slurries used in the production of magnetic stripe cards.

== Corporate history ==
Logo from around 1981

In 1977, Pyral made the original blank disks for the Golden Record of the NASA Voyager spacecraft. Although the company was originally based in Créteil, France, it moved to the Avranches location in 1985. Prior to 2004, it was part of EMTEC, BASF, and Rhône-Poulenc. From that same year until the acquisition by Mulann, it was an independent company. In 2012, Pyral acquired RMGI, a maker of analog tape used for sound recording. In 2015, after financial difficulties integrating RMGI, Pyral was acquired by Mulann.
