= IBM dictation machines =

Dictation machines sold by IBM from 1960 to 1981

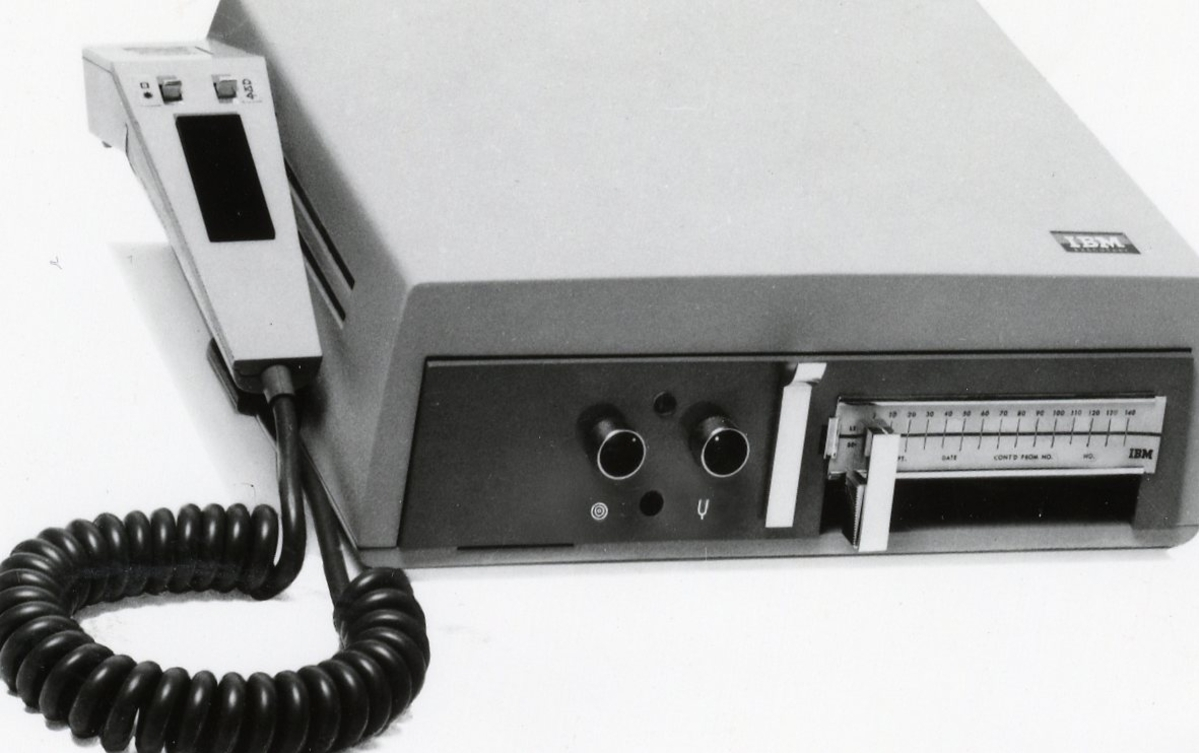
- Introduced: 1960
- Discontinued: 1982

IBM Electric Typewriter Division (later IBM Office Products Division or OPD) manufactured and sold dictation equipment from 1960 until 1982. This was a totally new product area for IBM who had no previous experience in this field. The Typewriter Division entered the market to meet Thomas J. Watson Jr.'s goal to double their business size every five years, which given their dominance in the electric typewriter market, meant they needed to offer a wider variety of product types. IBMs goal with dictation machines was to provide efficient, easy to use products that offered high audio fidelity. However while dictation machines were complementary with IBMs typewriter product range (since the two could be used and sold together), it did require IBMs Sales reps to learn how to sell a totally different product. This was because many executives (included IBM's own) were reluctant to use dictation machines. IBM was the market leader by 1965, outselling their biggest competitor Dictaphone and driving Ediphone (a division of Edison) out of the market. Unit sales peaked in 1969 at 98,000 units, which was roughly a 33% market share.

== Peirce Wire Recorder Company (1940–1959) ==
The origin of IBM's dictation machines began with a tube tester company called Radiotechnic Laboratories, founded in the late 1920s in Evanston, IL. Charles Peirce bought the company in 1938 and in an attempt to find new revenue sources, they began making wire recorders for the US Army in 1940. Peirce subsequently changed the company name to the Peirce Wire Recorder Company. In September 1945 they released the first wire recorder for public consumption, selling them through Macy's Departments Store in New York for US$400 with a recording time of 60 minutes.

They were soon however outcompeted by companies like Webcor and by disk recorders sold by Audograph and Gray, but survived because they had an exclusive contract with the US Air Force to supply cockpit voice recorders. Looking to develop a better alternative to the wax cylinder dictation machine, they developed a dictation machine that records on a magnetic belt and which does not rely on sprocket holes (since the holes wear out over time). This was released in 1952 and technically perfected by 1955 with their 560 D model, at which time the company was renamed to Peirce Dictation Systems.

In October 1958 IBM contacted Peirce as they were looking to shortcut product development time for dictation machines by purchasing the intellectual property of a company they assess as technically superior. While being one of the smallest dictation machine manufacturers in the US, Peirce were the only USA based one using magnetic media, which IBM favored. After the economic downturn of 1957/58, Charles Peirce was willing to sell the patents and assets of his company and so a contract was signed on July 15, 1959, and the sale completed on August 15, 1959. This was the first company IBM had acquired since 1933 when they bought the Electromatic Typewriter Company. Of the roughly 100 employees at Peirce at that time, IBM only hired 10, leaving Peirce to retrench the other 90. IBM retained Charles Peirce as a consultant but effectively never used his services. They did, however, hire his son-in-law Sam Kalow, who become the Sales Manager and later Product Manager of IBM dictation equipment, remaining with IBM until 1969.

== IBM Executary ==
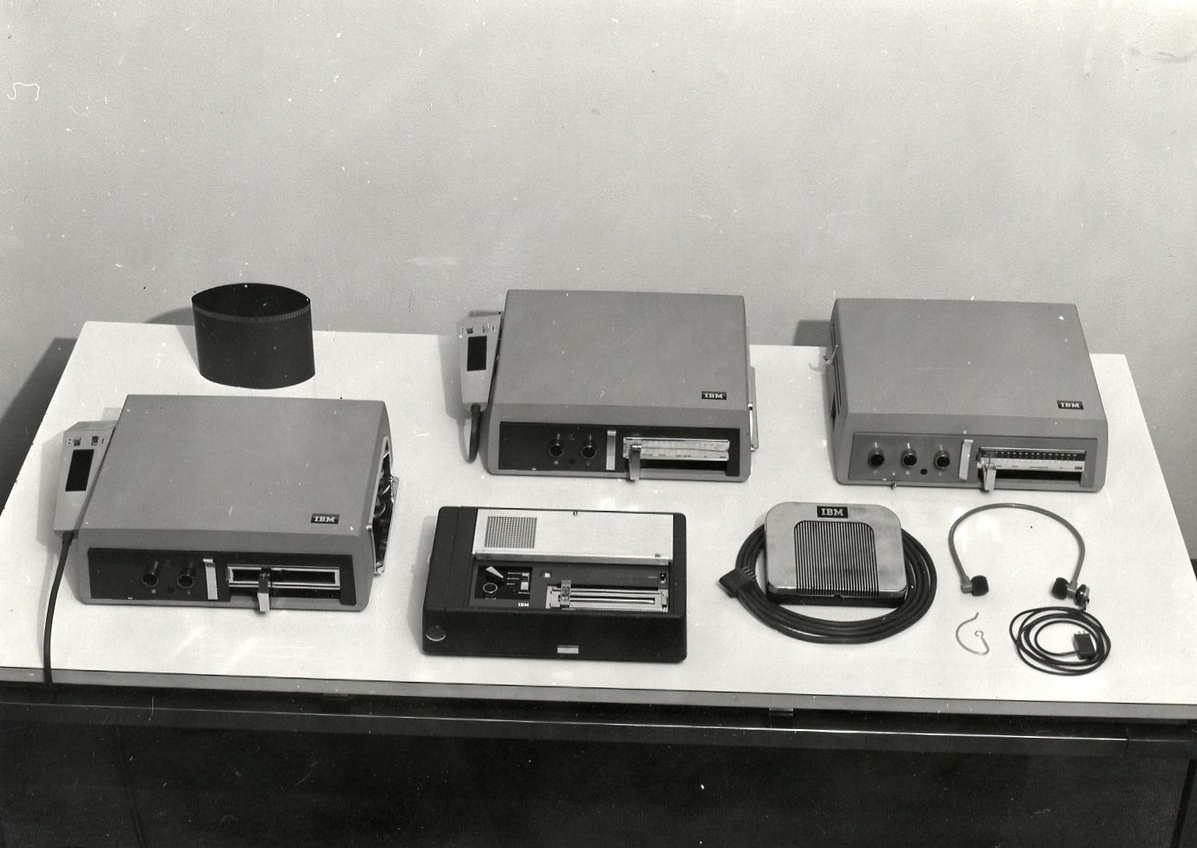
Models 211, 212, 213 and 224 with foot pedal and headphones.

The IBM Executary Dictation Machine was announced on October 17, 1960, by the IBM Electric Typewriter Division. The term Executary is a combination of the words executive and secretary.

They record dictation on a magnetic belt called a Magnabelt (a mylar belt coated with a ferromagnetic material), that can hold up to 14 minutes of recordings. A bar magnet can be used to perform a complete erasure of the belt in six seconds. IBM advertising at the time simply said: "It could very well change your ideas about dictation equipment". IBM initially claimed the belt could be re-used 1000s of times and could be easily mailed, although later advertising only claimed re-use of 100s of times. IBM will later offer a belt that can hold 28 minutes.

=== IBM Executary Model 211/212/213 ===
There are three models. They measure 11 in (280 mm) x 9 1/4 in (230 mm) x 3 1/4 in (83 mm) and weigh around 14 lb (6.4 kg). The front panel is blue unless a no-charge colour panel is specified with the order. The models are:

- IBM Executary Model 211- Dictation Machine (6165-211) Uses a 4 in (100 mm) belt. Sold for US$395.
- IBM Executary Model 212 - Transcribing Machine (6166-212) Uses a 4 in (100 mm) belt. Sold for US$370.
- IBM Executary Model 213 - Combination Machine (6167-213) Uses a 4 in (100 mm) belt. Sold for US$450.

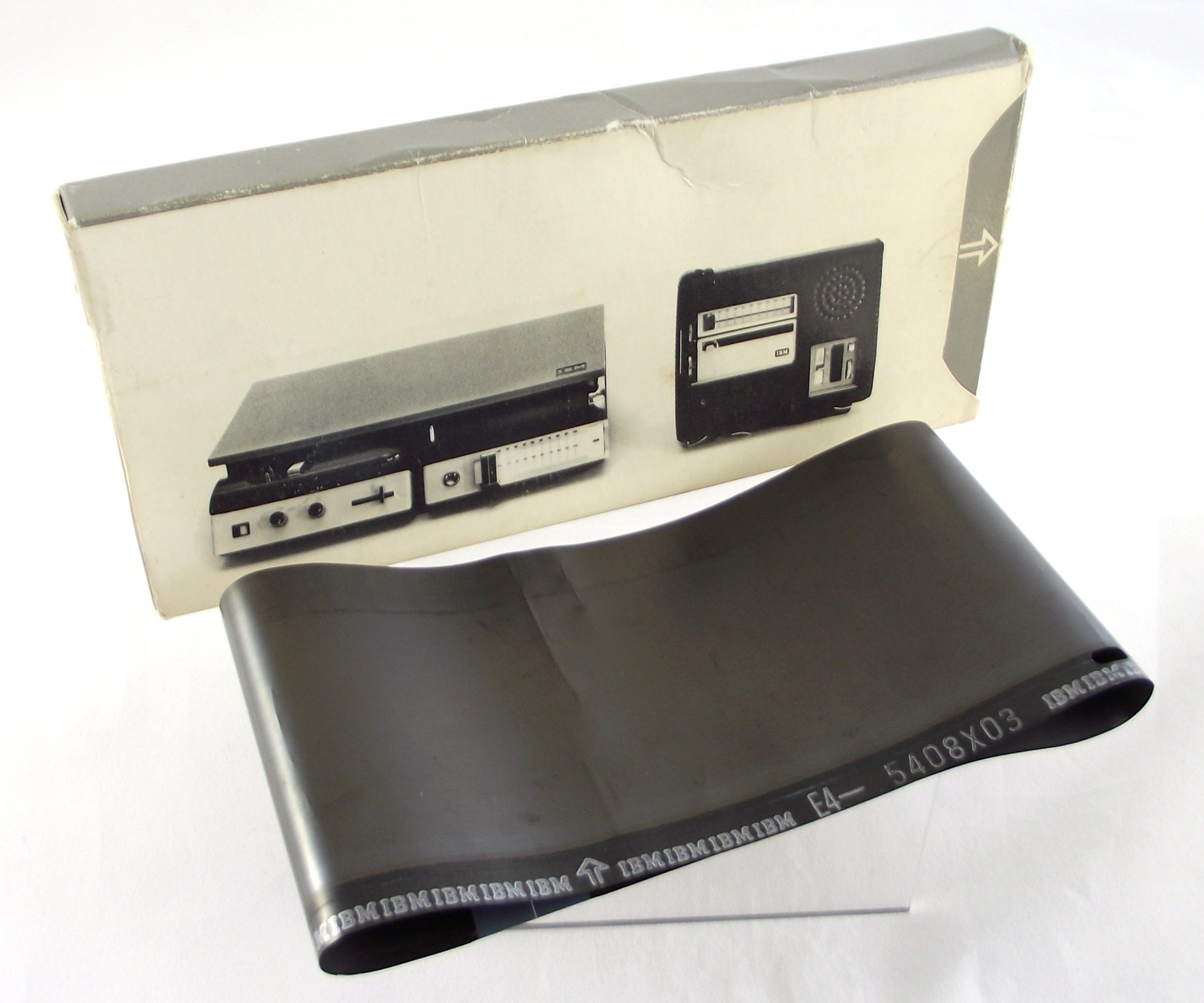
IBM Magnabelt

=== IBM Executary Model 214 ===
The Model 214 is a portable unit that is larger than the Model 211 and was introduced in July 1961.

- IBM Executary Model 214 Portable (6161-214). Uses a 4 in (100 mm) belt. Uses 5 C-Cell batteries. Weighs 6.25 lb (2.83 kg). Sold for US$385.

=== IBM Executary Model 224 Dictation Unit ===
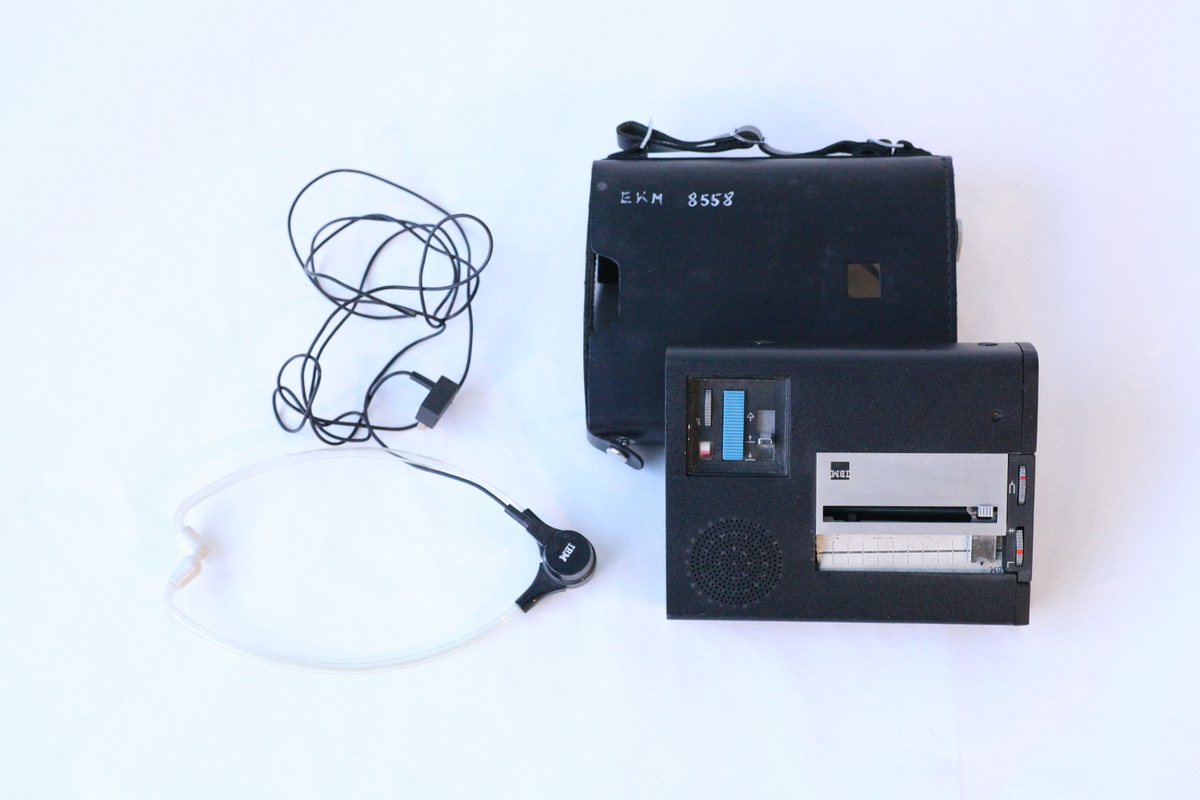
IBM Executary Model 224 Dictation Unit with IBM branded headphones and case

The Model 224 is a portable dictation machine released in 1965 as a follow-on to the much larger Model 214. The combination of its low weight and small form factor with integrated microphone and a very quiet motor, made it a sales success, especially as it was very easy to demonstrate. The success of the Model 224 helped promote sales across the whole product line.

- IBM Executary Model 224 Dictation Unit (6161-224)
- It is 6 in (150 mm) x 5 in (130 mm) x 2 in (51 mm) and weighs 28 oz (790 g), including battery
- It has a 12V power supply and a special 11.2 volt IBM branded alkaline battery that is 25 mm (0.98 in) x 80 mm (3.1 in) and weighs 110 g (3.9 oz) on its own.
- The battery can be used for 16 hours since it uses only 40 mA while recording.
- It can hold 10 minutes of recording per belt.
- Uses a 3 in (76 mm) belt that records 6 seconds for each pass of the head. This allows the user to replay the last 6 seconds at the touch of a button. The belt size was selected to make it easy to mail it back to the users office to be transcribed.
- Optional foot control pedal and earphones can be attached.

=== IBM Executary Models 27x (1968–1972) ===
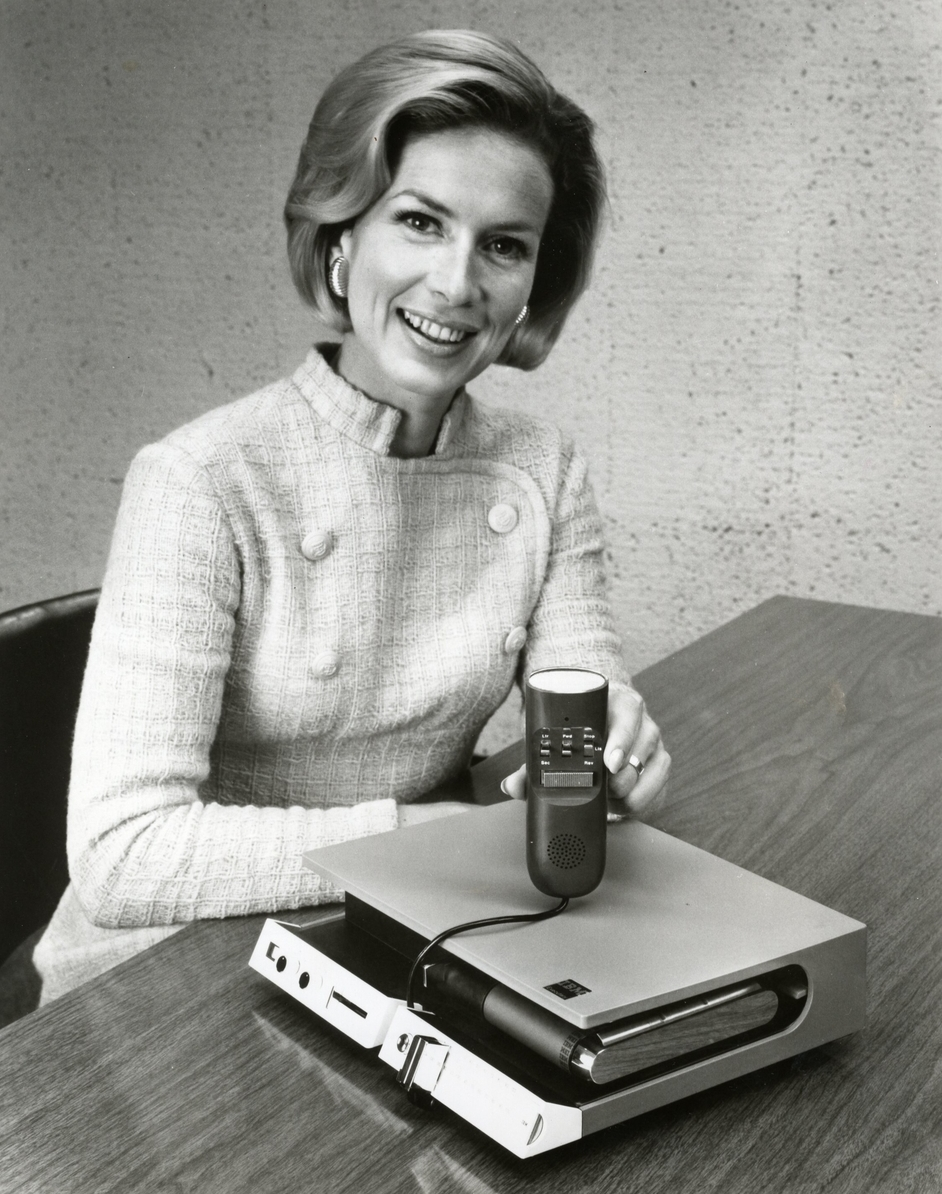
IBM Executary 271 Recorder

Announced on October 17, 1968, by IBM Office Products Division. The cases are designed by Eliot Noyes & Associates. According to IBM these new units have improved serviceability and distinctive new styling and offer more than 20 features.

There are three key new models that all use a 3 in (76 mm) belt that can hold either 10 or 20 minutes of recording time based on belt speed. The user can select the belt speed with a switch, with the 10 minute setting being compatible with the older transcribers.

- IBM Executary Model 271 Recorder (6171-271)
- IBM Executary Model 272 Transcriber (6172-272)
- IBM Executary Model 273 Combination (6161-273)

Also available in 1969 were the following:

- Model 233 - Remote Microphone Network Central Recorder (6161-233). This delivers remote dictation to a secretary from any number of microphones.
- PBX Central dictation system that connects telephone lines to dictation machines.

Announced in May 1971:

- IBM Executary Model 274 Portable Dictation Unit (6174-274) as a follow-on to the Model 224 (using the exact same form factor). 10 or 20 minute recording time in 6 or 12 second increments. Weighs 29 oz (820 g).

== IBM input processing equipment (1972–1975) ==
Announced September 1972, IBM renamed their dictation products as input processing equipment. The new branding was an unsuccessful attempt to market dictation machines to prospects who were averse to the term "dictation machine". They also used the 3 in (76 mm) belt.

The following models are listed as part of this release:

- IBM Model 171 Recorder (6168-171)
- IBM Model 172 Transcriber (6189-172)
- IBM Model 221 PABX Dictation system (6161-221)
- IBM Model 225 Message Recorder (6161-225)
- IBM Model 251 PABX Dictation Recorder (6161-251)
- IBM Model 255 Message Recorder (6161-255)
- IBM Model 275 System Recorder (6161-275)
- IBM Model 277 Tone Input System (6161-277)
- IBM Model 278 Dial Input System (6161-278)

== IBM 6:5 Cartridge System (1975–1981) ==
IBM 6:5 logo

Announced in March 1975, the 6:5 refers to the fact that each disc holds 6 minutes and by inserting two cartridges into a recorder you can record 5 hours, thus 6:5 equates to 6minutes:5hours. The cartridges came in five colours (including blue, orange and green). Eliot Noyes & Associates were again consulted on the design. Unlike in 1958 when Peirce is the only US based manufacturer using a magnetic medium, by the release of the 6:5 in 1975, IBM is the only manufacturer not using magnetic tape (the others are all using either an endless loop of magnetic tape, or are using standard, mini or micro cassettes). IBM described the advertising campaign to launch the 6:5 as the most extensive in the history of OPD.

There are three major models. The front logo on the larger models says: IBM 6:5

- 6:5 Recorder Type 281 (6164-281). Costs US $645 including microphone.
- 6:5 Transcriber Type 282 (6164-282). Costs US $645 including foot pedal and headset.
- 6:5 Portable Recorder Type 284 (6164-284)

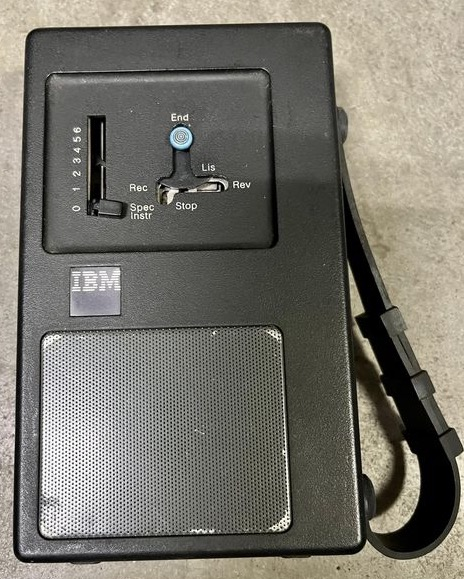
IBM 6:5 Portable Recorder Model 284

Has the following characteristics:

- Uses a cartridge that holds up to 25 magnetic discs. The discs are 3 1/4 in (83 mm) in size. Note they are referred to by IBM as discs not disks.
- The cartridge looks similar to a 3.5 inch floppy disk and are 3 1/2 in (89 mm) x 4 in (100 mm) x 3/8 in (9.5 mm) in size and cost US$25 for two carts (including 50 discs)
- Each disc holds 6 minutes of dictation time which is typically two typed pages.
- The unit has two cartridge readers, meaning 5 hours of recording.
- Dictation could be segmented with the contents of specific discs being marked as urgent for rush jobs.

Has the following additional machine types:

- 6:5 Messages Control/Dictation Equipment (6164-280)
- 6:5 Micro Controller 4x1/Dictation Equipment (6164-283)
- 6:5 Micro Controller 8x2/Dictation Equipment (6164-285)
- 6:5 Pulse Control/Dictation Equipment (6164-286)
- 6:5 Tone Control/Dictation Equipment (6164-287)
- 6:5 Dial Control/Dictation Equipment (6164-288)
- 6:5 Micro Control/Dictation Equipment (6164-290)

The American Nurses Association was an example customer. Staff could dial in externally and record dictation over the phone.

In a survey done by Management World magazine in 1981, IBM was number 4 in the market with 27% of the respondents using their products.

The 6:5 range was withdrawn from marketing Dec 31, 1981.

=== Cassette recorder ===
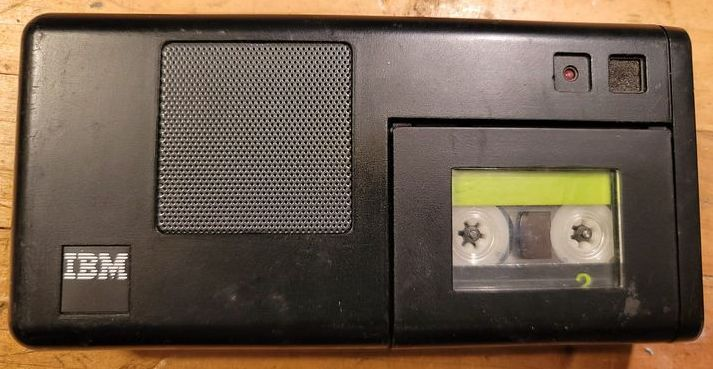
IBM Executive Recorder

In 1979 IBM announced a Mini-Cassette dictation recorder called the IBM Executive Recorder, manufactured by a third party in Japan. It weighs 10 oz (280 g) and can record 30 minutes. It can also be used as a transcriber with an optional foot-pedal, headset and power adapter. The sound quality is poor compared to competing micro-cassette machines and it is incompatible with either IBM's magnetic belt or 6:5 models. In response to complaints, IBM Austin developed a dual-media transcriber (Model 292) that accepts both the mini-cassette and the 6:5 cartridge.

- IBM Executive Recorder Model 294 (6501-294)
- 6:5 Disk/Cassette Transcriber Model 292 (6502-292)

The mini-cassette dictation recorder was not successful in the marketplace and was withdrawn on September 30, 1982.

== Famous users ==
Lyndon B. Johnson used a variety of dictation machines from various vendors including an IBM Executary to record telephone conversations.

Richard Nixon used a portable IBM Executary to record meeting notes. He also kept one beside his bed.

== Manufacturing plants ==
Dictation machines were designed and assembled by IBM Lexington as well as by IBM Canada. Development was also performed by IBM Austin.

In 1962 IBM Berlin (West Germany) began manufacturing dictation equipment. A new Office Products plant was constructed in Berlin in 1974 that shipped to 84 countries. It was the only plant outside the USA that manufactured dictation machines.
