= SoundScriber =

Dictation machine introduced in 1945

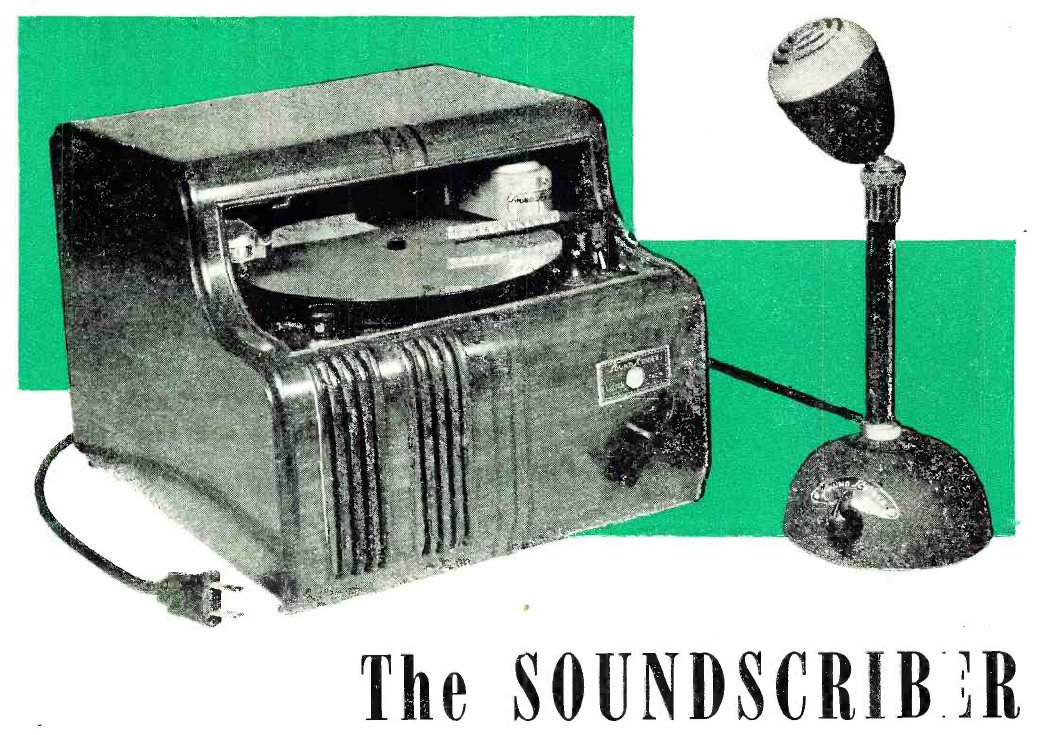
Soundscriber machine from 1944 advertisement

SoundScriber is a dictation machine introduced in 1945 by The SoundScriber Corp. (New Haven, Connecticut, United States). It records sound with a groove embossed into soft vinyl discs with a stylus. Similar competing recording technologies are the Gray Audograph and Dictaphone DictaBelt. The machine can record 15 minutes of dictation on each side of a thin (.01-inch) flexible 6-inch vinyl disc spinning at a rate of 33 1/3 RPM, at a density of 200 grooves per inch. The discs originally cost about 10 cents each. The machine has two tonearms: a recording arm driven by a worm gear that creates the groove with a diamond stylus, and a pickup arm with a sapphire stylus for playback. A foot-operated playback/pause—and-reverse switch is used for transcribing.

Unlike some other recording technologies of the time, the recording stylus creates the groove not by cutting the vinyl but by embossing (plastically deforming) the surface, leaving no waste plastic chips to get into the mechanical works.

The format remained popular for two decades before it was superseded by magnetic tape recorders, due in part to the robustness of the discs and the ease with which they could be mailed. The green discs with their characteristic square center hole came in three sizes, 6 inches (known as "Mail Chute") that played for fifteen minutes per side, a 5-inch disc with 10 minutes of recording time per side, and 4-inch "Memo Discs" with eight minutes of recording time. The soft vinyl medium limited the number of times a disc could be played back without degradation of the audio quality.

A SoundScriber is a plot device in the 1952 Joan Crawford film Sudden Fear, as the brand name can be clearly seen on it, even though Crawford's character claims that she had it built herself.
