= Anders Kristiansen =

Anders Kristiansen may refer to:

- Anders Kristiansen (businessman) (born 1967), Danish businessman
- Anders Kristiansen (badminton) (born 1979), Danish badminton player
- Anders Kristiansen (footballer) (born 1990), Norwegian footballer
