= Recording Media Group International =

Dutch magnetic tape manufacturer (1968–2012)

Recording Media Group International B.V., sometimes also named as Recordable Media Group International (also known as RMGi), was a Dutch manufacturer of magnetic tape products based in Oosterhout. This plant was initially built by Philips in 1968, and spun off into a joint venture with DuPont, PDM (Philips DuPont Magnetics B.V.) which lasted until 1993. At this point, an unknown foreign investor (probably SK of Germany) took over the plant and named the company Magnetic Products Oosterhout B.V. In 2004, the company became known by its current name after acquiring equipment, processes, and talent from EMTEC's Munich plant. For its entire existence, the factory has produced magnetic tape for recording audio and video. Production of video and digital audio tapes were later ended and company concentrated only on production of high-quality analog magnetic tapes for both reel-to-reel and cassette recorders. Production of cassette tape stock (especially for cassette duplication facilities) were later ended as well.

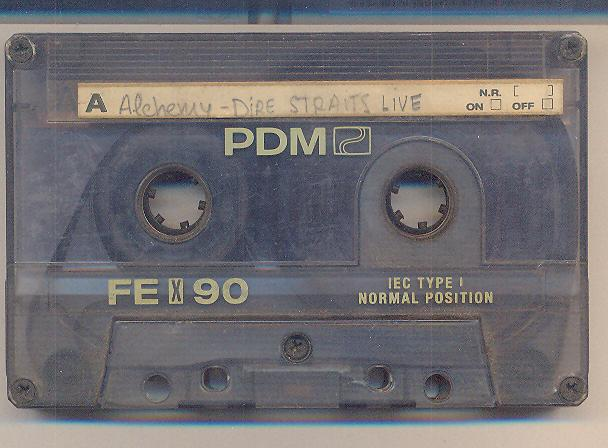
PDM-branded Compact Cassette tape

They sold products under the EMTEC brand as well as its own name, RMGi, which later replaced EMTEC brand, due to its different ownership.

In 2012 French company Pyral took over RMGI, closing the original Dutch plant down. Equipment was moved to the Pyral site in France in Avranches, France, and a new building was set up to run audio tape manufacturing. At the same time, the RMGi branding was discontinued and replaced with Pyral one. In October 2013 Pyral went into receivership protection, largely due to the cost of setting up the RMGi tape equipment and the cost of the new building.

In January 2015 the company Mulann was awarded the assets of Pyral by French Court decision for an undisclosed amount of money and resumed production of the open reel tapes. Tape production was resumed under Mulann brand and since 2016 they're being sold under Recording the Masters brand name. New owner (like Pyral in 2012) first continued production of SM900, SM911, SM468 and LPR35 tapes (all of these originally launched by BASF). Its first new tape product was launched in September 2016 and was LPR90, based on SM900 formulation and designed for long play (like LPR35 tape). In 2018, they resumed production of cassette tapes.

== See also ==
- Quantegy - defunct American competitor
