= Anders Kristiansen (businessman) =

Danish businessman

Anders Christian Kristiansen (born 5 February 1967) is a Danish businessman and an ex-chief Executive of the British retail chain New Look. He was appointed Chief executive of Esprit in 2018.

== Early life ==
Kristiansen grew up in Denmark.

== Career ==
Early in his career, Kristiansen held executive positions at Bog & Ide in Denmark and Euro Buro in Germany. Kristiansen was Director of International Accounts at Herlitz in Germany before becoming European Sales and Marketing Director at GBC in Belgium.

In 2000, Kristiansen joined Lyreco, the worldwide distributor of office supplies and workplace products, serving as Managing Director of Europe in France. From 2003 to 2010, Kristiansen was Managing Director for Asia Pacific, based in China.

=== Staples Inc. ===
In 2010, Kristiansen was appointed President of China and SVP at Staples Inc., the Fortune 500 American multinational office supply retailing corporation listed on the New York Stock Exchange, and was a member of the Senior Leadership Team.

=== BESTSELLER Fashion Group China ===
In 2011, Kristiansen was appointed Vice CEO of Bestseller Fashion Group China, one of China's leading fashion retailers, operating more than 7,000 stores in over 500 cities throughout China.

=== New Look ===
In 2013, Kristiansen was appointed Chief Executive of New Look, the global fashion retailer based in Weymouth in Dorset. New Look has over 1,100 stores in 16 countries. During his time at the company, New Look implemented an omnichannel retail strategy, launched several third-party ecommerce platforms and entered the Chinese market to build a network of 130 stores alongside an online business in the country. In May 2015, New Look was sold to Brait SA, the investment company, for £1.9bn. Kristiansen departed the business in September 2017 following a significant drop in revenue and profits, from which the business has struggled to recover.

=== Permira ===
Kristiansen is an advisor to Permira, a global private equity fund.

=== Esprit ===
In March 2018, Kristiansen was appointed Group CEO of Esprit Holdings, a global retail brand selling fashion and housewares, succeeding Jose Martínez.

Business positions
Preceded by Alistair McGeorge (Executive Chairman)	Chief Executive of New Look -	Succeeded by Incumbent
