= Dictaphone =

American producer of dictation machines

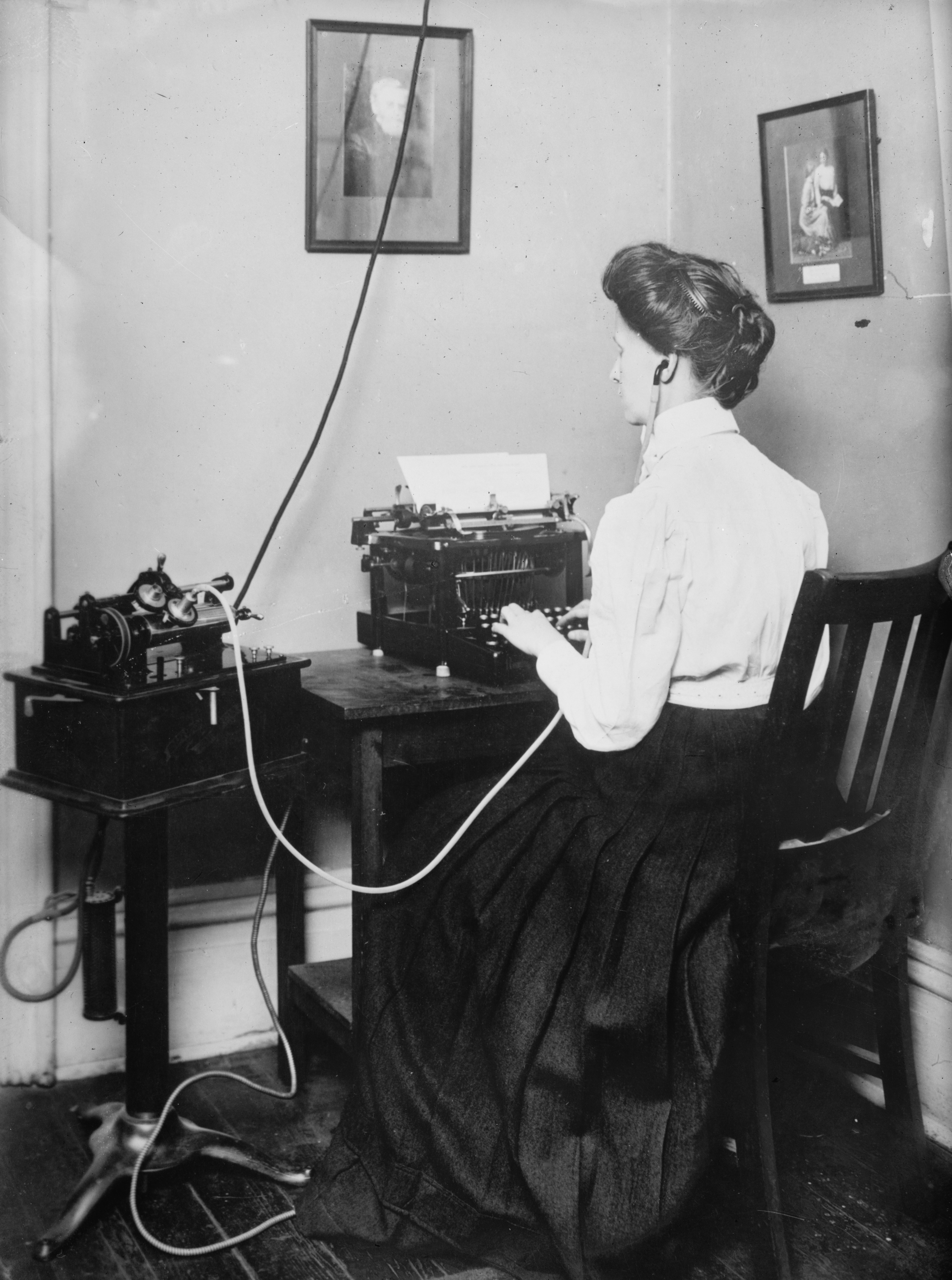
Blind stenographer from the Overbrook School for the Blind using a dictaphone

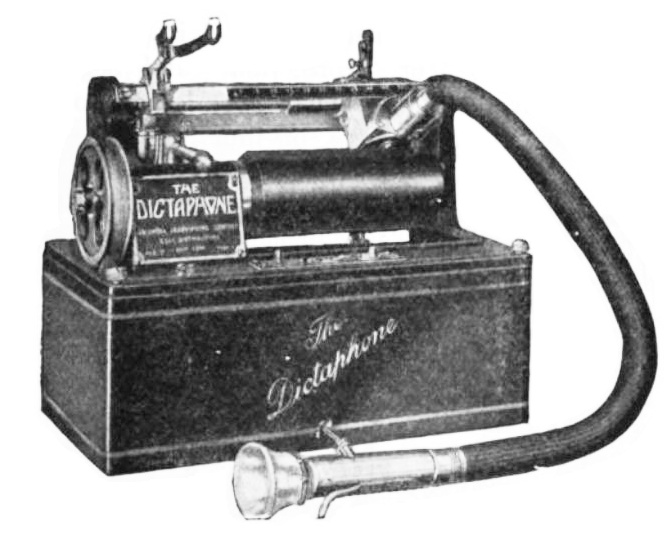
Dictaphone wax cylinder dictation machine

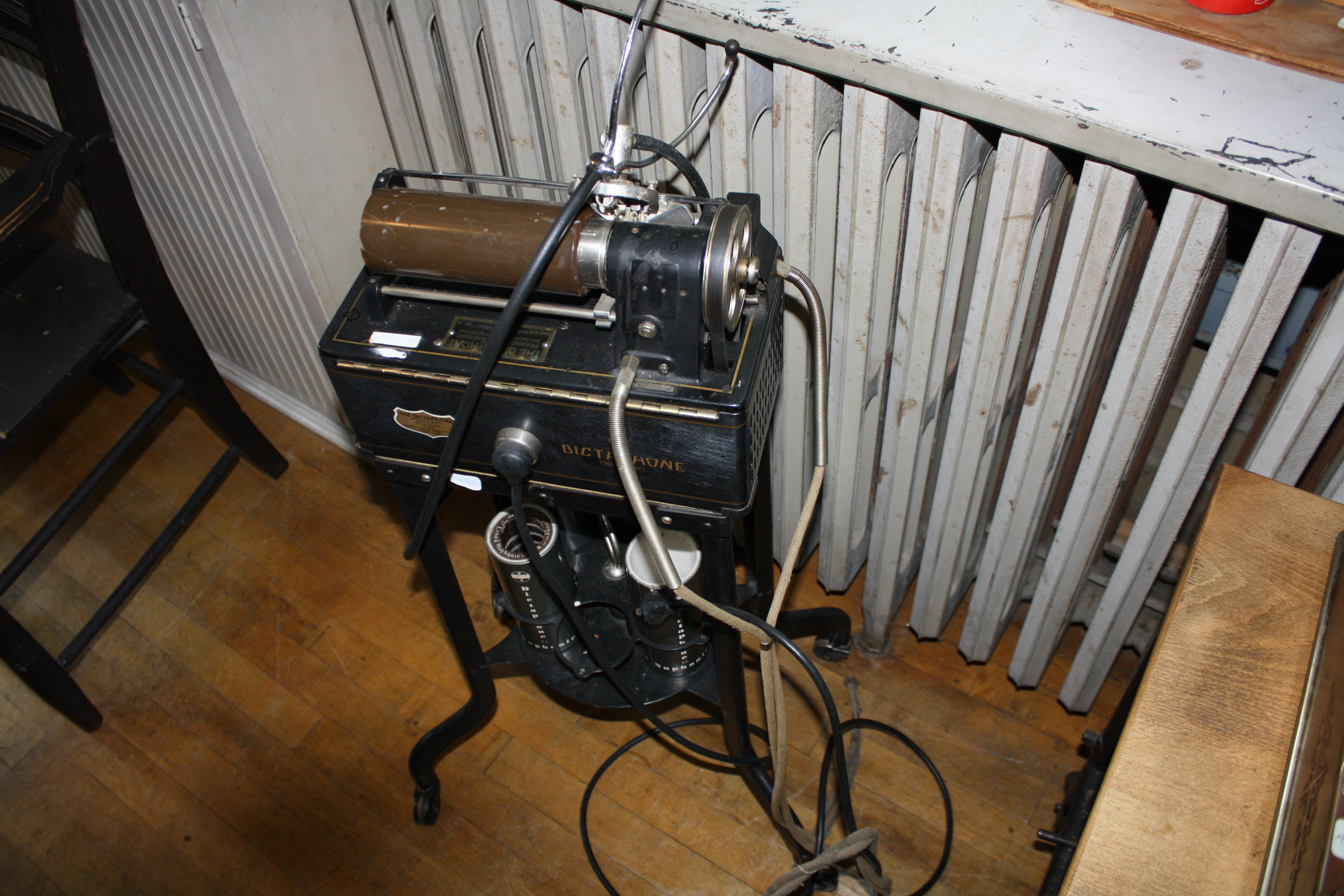
Dictaphone on display in a museum

Dictaphone was an American company that produced dictation machines; its roots go back to Alexander Graham Bell's Volta Laboratory. It is now a division of Nuance Communications, based in Burlington, Massachusetts.

Although the name "Dictaphone" is a trademark, it has become genericized as a means to refer to any dictation machine.

== History ==
The Volta Laboratory was established by Alexander Graham Bell in Washington, D.C. in 1881. When the Laboratory's sound-recording inventions were sufficiently developed with the assistance of Charles Sumner Tainter and others, Bell and his associates set up the Volta Graphophone Company, which later merged with the American Graphophone Company (founded in 1887) which itself later evolved into Columbia Records (founded as the Columbia Phonograph Company in 1889).

The name "Dictaphone" was trademarked in 1907 by the Columbia Graphophone Company, which soon became the leading manufacturer of such devices. This perpetuated the use for voice recording of wax cylinders, which had otherwise been eclipsed by disc-based technology. Dictaphone was spun off into a separate company in 1923 under the leadership of C. King Woodbridge.

In March 1932, a Dictaphone was used to solve the kidnapping of Peoria, Illinois physician James Parker. The Secret Six, a powerful, wealthy vigilante organization based in Chicago, suspected Peoria attorney Joseph Pursifull of involvement in the crime and placed listening devices in his office connected to a Dictaphone in the building's basement. Using evidence gathered through that means, as well as a confession reportedly beaten out of Pursifull's co-conspirator, James Betson, the Secret Six helped to convict eight people in the kidnapping, with sentences ranging from five to 25 years.

In 1947, having relied on wax-cylinder recording to the end of World War II, Dictaphone introduced its Dictabelt technology. This cut a mechanical groove into a Lexan plastic belt instead of into a wax cylinder. The advantage of the Lexan belt was that recordings were permanent and admissible in court. Eventually IBM introduced a dictating machine using an erasable belt made of magnetic tape which enabled the user to correct dictation errors rather than marking errors on a paper tab. Dictaphone in turn added magnetic recording models while still selling the models recording on the Lexan belts. Machines based on magnetic tape recording were introduced in the late seventies, initially using the standard compact (or "C") cassette, but soon, in dictation machines, using mini-cassettes or microcassettes instead. Using smaller cassette sizes was important to the manufacturer for reducing the size of portable recorders.

Walter D. Fuller became a director of the company in 1952. In 1969 he was appointed as chairman.

In Japan, JVC was licensed to produce machines designed and developed by Dictaphone. Dictaphone and JVC later developed the picocassette, released in 1985, which was even smaller than a microcassette but retained a good recording quality and duration.

Dictaphone also developed "endless loop" recording using magnetic tape, introduced in the mid-seventies as the "Thought Tank". The recording medium did not need to be moved from where the dictation took place to the location such as a typing pool where the typists were located. This was normally operated via a dedicated in-house telephone system, enabling dictation to be made from a variety of locations within the hospital or other organizations with typing pools. One version calculated each typist's turnaround time and allocated the next piece of dictation accordingly.

Dictaphone was prominent in the provision of multi-channel recorders, used extensively in the emergency services to record emergency telephone calls (to numbers such as 911, 999, 112) and subsequent conversations.

Additionally, Dictaphone at one point expanded its product line to market a line of electronic (desktop and portable) calculators.

In 1979, Dictaphone was purchased by Pitney Bowes and kept as a wholly owned but independent subsidiary.

Dictaphone bought Dual Display Word Processor, a stiff competitor to Wang Laboratories, the industry leader.

In 1982, it marketed a word processor from Symantec. The hardware sold for $5,950 in 1982. The software was an additional $600. The advent of the personal computer, MS-DOS, and general-purpose word-processing software saw the demise of the dedicated word-processor, and the division was closed.

In 1995, Pitney Bowes sold Dictaphone to the investment group Stonington Partners of Connecticut for a reported $462 million. Dictaphone thereafter sold a range of products that included speech-recognition and voicemail software with limited success as the market only existed among some early adopters despite its vertical markets' enhancements.

In 2000, Dictaphone was acquired by the then-leading Belgian voice-recognition and translation company Lernout & Hauspie for nearly $1 billion. Lernout & Hauspie provided the voice-recognition technology for Dictaphone's enhanced voice-recognition-based transcription system. Soon after the purchase, however, the SEC raised questions about Lernout & Hauspie's finances, focusing on the supposedly skyrocketing income reported from its East Asian endeavors. Subsequently, the company and all its subsidiaries, including Dictaphone, were forced into bankruptcy protection.

In early 2002, Dictaphone emerged from bankruptcy as a privately held organization, with Rob Schwager as its chairman and CEO. In 2004, it was split into three divisions:

- IHS, focusing on dictation for the healthcare and medical industries;
- IVS, focusing on dictation in law offices and police stations;
- CRS (Communications Recording Systems), focusing on voice logging and radios for use by public-safety organizations and quality-monitoring by call centers.

In June 2005, Dictaphone Corporation announced the sale of its Communications Recording Systems to NICE Systems for $38.5 million. This was considered a great bargain in the industry and came after NICE was ordered to pay Dictaphone $10 million in settlements related to a patent-infringement suit in late 2003.

In September 2005, Dictaphone sold its IVS business outside the United States to a private Swiss group around its former VP Martin Niederberger, who formed Dictaphone IVS AG (later Calison AG) in Urdorf, Switzerland and developed "FRISBEE", the first hardware-independent dictation-management software system with integrated speech-recognition and workflow management. In 2008, iSpeech AG took over the activities and products of the former Calison AG.

In February and March 2006, the remainder of Dictaphone was sold for $357 million to Nuance Communications (formerly ScanSoft), ending its short tenure as an independent company that had begun in 2002. This, in effect, closed a circle of events, as Dictaphone had been sold to Lernout & Hauspie prior to L&H's bankruptcy which resulted in Dictaphone becoming an independent company.

In March 2007, Nuance acquired Focus Infomatics and, with the intention of further expansion in its healthcare-transcription business, linked it with its Dictaphone division.

== See also ==
- Carl Lindström Company, creator of the Parlophone company, which evolved into a music label that first released The Beatles albums
