= Edison Voicewriter =

Machine

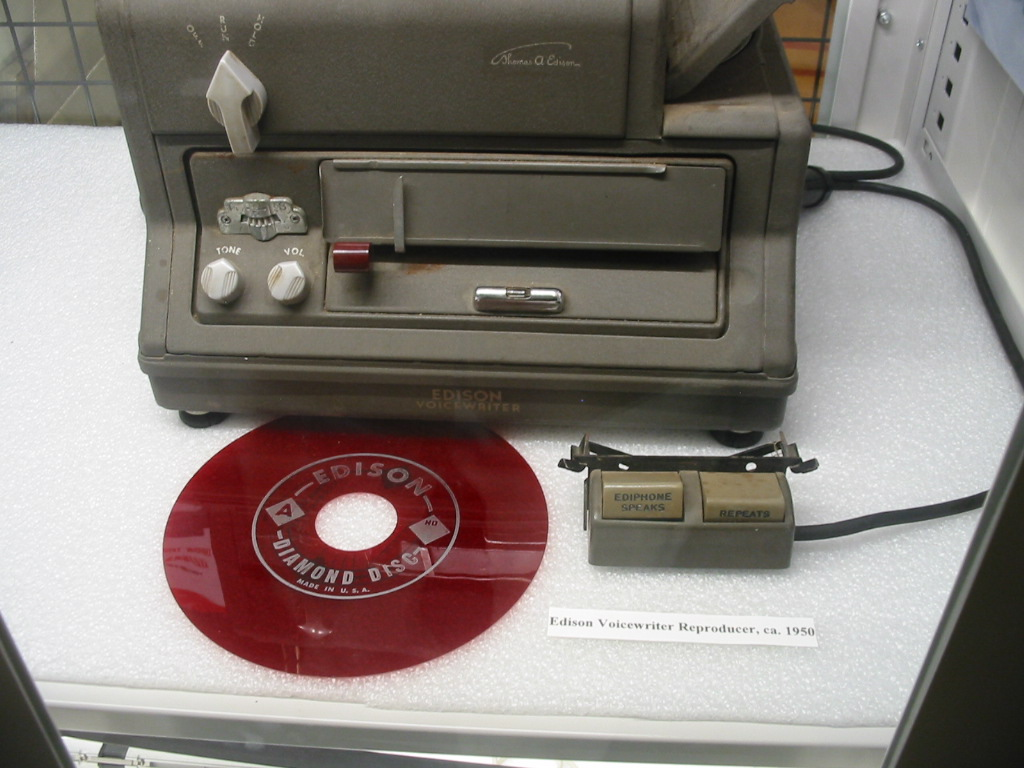
- Type: Dictation machine
- Inception: 1945
- Manufacturer: Thomas A. Edison, Inc.

The Edison Voicewriter (also marketed as the Ediphone) is a dictation machine designed by Thomas A. Edison, Inc.. It was developed in the early 1940s and introduced to the market in 1945.

The machine uses a unique vertical mechanism to emboss sounds onto red plastic discs called diamond discs.
