= EMTEC =

Magnetic tape manufacturer

- Type: Subsidiary
- Predecessor: BASF Magnetics
- Founded: 1991
- Headquarters: Gennevilliers, France
- Products: Computer data storage media, other computer products
- Number of employees: 150 (2004)
- Parent: Dexxon Group
- Website: www.emtec-international.com

EMTEC markets consumer computer data storage products and other computer related consumables. The company is part of the Dexxon Group, headquartered in Gennevilliers, France.

EMTEC evolved from BASF Magnetics, originally producing magnetic tapes. Since its origin, EMTEC has undergone several transformations. Between 1998 and 2002 all of BASF's cassette lineup (Ferro Extra, Chrome Extra and Chrome Super, along with the budget tapes Sound 1 and Sound 2) were rebranded EMTEC. While cassette manufacture has since ceased in 2005, and reel-to-reel tape operations were sold to RMGI, EMTEC continues to manufacture other recordable media such as optical discs, memory cards, and USB flash drives. Distribution channels have decreased and EMTEC presence in the market is a shadow of its former BASF self.

== History ==
- ~1930s — High quality magnetic tape is developed at I.G.Farben's Ludwigshafen plant.
- 1945~1952 — I.G Farben is broken up into several companies, including BASF & AGFA. The Ludwigshafen plant is now part of BASF. AGFA's Wolfen plant is now in East Germany.
- 1964 — Products of the Wolfen plant are rebranded as ORWO.

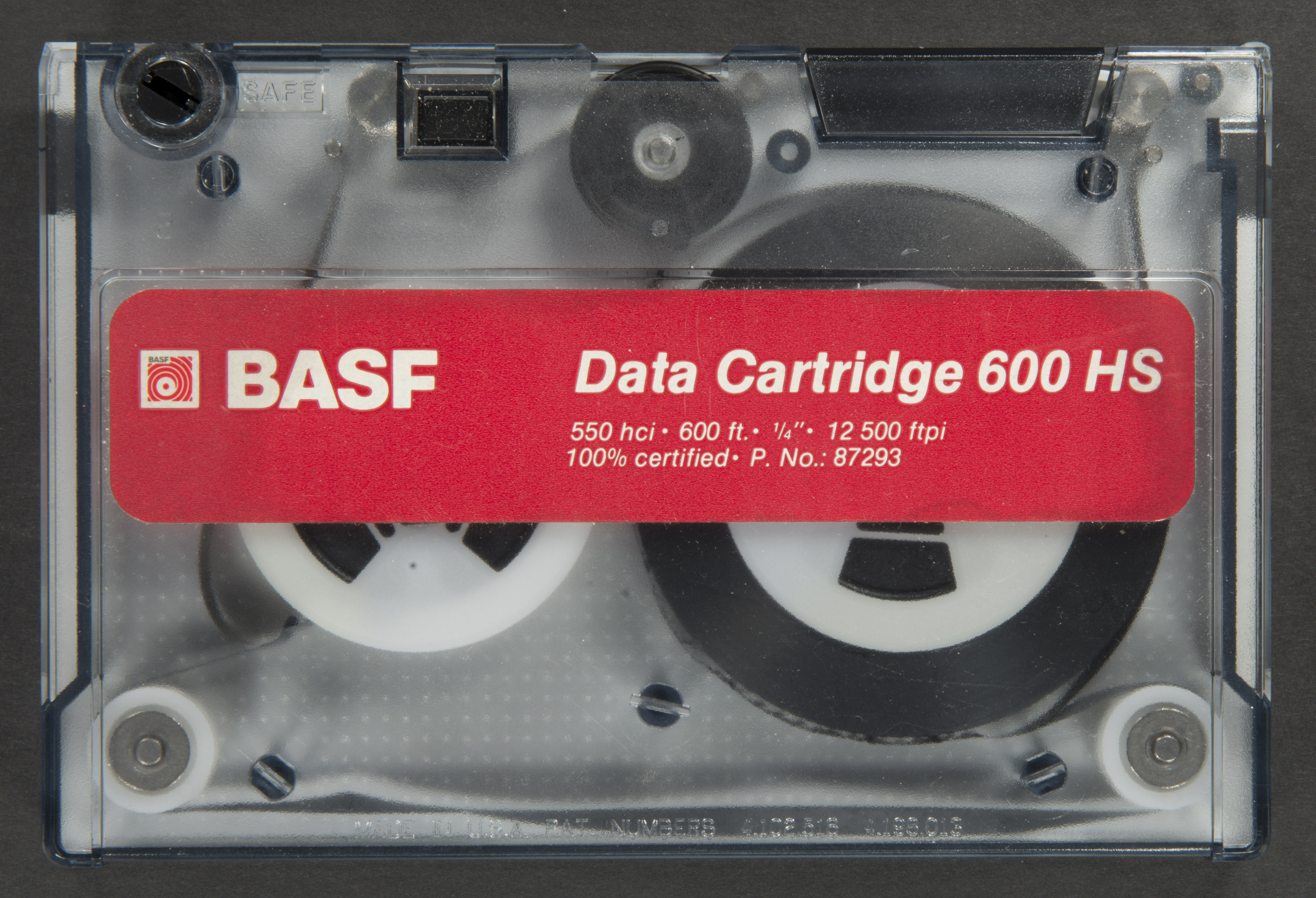
BASF magnetic tape data cartridge (QIC)

- 1990 — BASF acquires AGFA's magnetic tape business.
- 1991 — BASF Magnetics was spun off from BASF into an independent company, but still 100% owned by BASF.
- 1997 — The company changed its name to EMTEC Magnetics after being sold to KOHAP, Ltd., a Korean textile firm with expertise in PET, the base film used for magnetic tape.
- 1999 — EMTEC is a compliance-verified licensed manufacturer of LTO technology media products.
- 2002 — Due to Asian financial crisis, KOHAP sold EMTEC to Legal & General Ventures Ltd. (LGV), a British holding company.
- 2003, January — EMTEC Magnetics GmbH (a subdivision) files for bankruptcy protection in Germany.
- 2003, October — Imation completed its acquisition of certain data storage assets (including patents and licenses) of EMTEC Magnetics GmbH for approximately US$15 million.
- 2004 — MPO France, formerly known as Moulages Plastiques de l'Ouest (not to be confused with Magnetic Products Oosterhout) acquired certain assets of EMTEC Consumer Media GmbH. This included rights to use the trade name EMTEC.
- 2004 — Specialized equipment from EMTEC's Willstätt and Munich plants is liquidated at auction. Some analog audio tape production equipment was acquired by Recording Media Group International (RMGI) who now makes EMTEC-branded audio tape.
- 2006, May — EMTEC was acquired by The Dexxon Group, a French computer products distribution company.
- 2011 — EMTEC began creating Flash drives shaped like rubber animals. When the rubber is separated, the flash drive inside is revealed. There are multiple selections, some being a penguin, turtle, rabbit, chicken, clownfish, and dolphin.

== Subsidiaries ==
- Pyral — Based in Avranches France, formerly of the chemical group Rhône-Poulenc, made independent in 2004.
- EMTEC Magnetics GmbH — Based in Ludwigshafen am Rhein, Germany and included major coating and converting plants in Willstaett and Munich, Germany, now defunct.
- EMTEC Consumer Media GmbH — Based in Ludwigshafen, but included many French assets. This included a cassette fabrication and loading facility in Obenheim. Made independent in November 2002.
- EMTEC da Amazônia — Based in Manaus, Brazil, packaging plant.
