= Gold Record (disambiguation) =

A gold record is a common designation for music recording certifications.

Gold Record may also refer to:

- Gold Record (album), a 2020 album by Bill Callahan
- The Gold Record, a 2006 album by the Bouncing Souls

== See also ==
- Golden Record (disambiguation)
