= Voice logging =

Practice of routinely recording audio of telephone calls

Voice logging is the practice of regularly recording telephone conversations. Business sectors which often do voice logging include public safety (e.g. 9-1-1 and emergency response systems), customer service call centers (conversations are recorded for quality assurance purposes), and finance (e.g. telephone-initiated stock trades are recorded for compliance purposes). Although voice logging is usually performed on conventional telephone lines, it is also frequently used for recording open microphones (e.g. on a stock trading floor) and for broadcast radio.

Early voice loggers recorded POTS lines onto analog magnetic tape. As telephony became more digital, so did voice loggers, and starting in the 1990s, voice loggers digitized the audio using a codec and recorded to digital tape. With modern VoIP systems, many voice loggers now simply store calls to a file on a hard drive.

== History ==
The original voice logging system was a large analog tape recorder developed by Magnasync in 1950. In 1953, Magnasync Corporation sold 300 voice loggers to the U.S. Air Force.

== Types of voice loggers ==
- Analog tape: the oldest models use reel-to-reel tape to record multiple phone lines to multiple tracks on the tape. Simple recorders also exist which use individual cassette or microcassette tape recorders on each individual phone. Later analog systems recorded 64 simultaneous phone calls onto a VHS cartridge.
- Digital tape (or recordable disk): These are the most commonly used today. They typically consist of proprietary hardware which is attached to the trunk lines for the enterprise (typically POTS, T1, or E1 lines). Later systems often consist of a PC motherboard with specialized interface hardware in a PCI slot. Digital systems also record detailed metadata about recorded calls, including start/stop timestamps, extension number or name, dialed DTMF tones, Caller ID, DNIS, and more. Many systems allow administrators to listen to live conversations or to access records from any remote location over a LAN. In addition, analytical tools are available which allow searching and quality reporting.
- Software-only systems: These systems may be all-software running on industry-standard servers, or use hardware such as a sound card on a PC, to do the work of recording and monitoring telephone calls. Some are simple single-user systems that typically only require a user to install the software on their PC, and use some type of simple adapter to connect the PC to a phone. However this type of software can usually only record a single line at a time, and is much more limited in features. Business-class recording and monitoring systems enable businesses of all sizes to deploy centralized call recording and monitoring for IP telephony systems.

== See also ==
- Call-recording hardware
- Dictation machine
- Telephone tapping
