= Digital Speech Standard =

Digital Speech Standard (DSS) is a proprietary compressed digital audio file format defined by the International Voice Association, a consortium of Olympus, Philips and Grundig Business Systems.

DSS was originally developed in 1994 by Grundig with the University of Nuremberg. In 1997, the digital speech standard was released, which was based on the previous codec. It is commonly used on digital dictation recorders. Modern psychoacoustical codecs that perform nearly as well at only slightly higher bitrates have led to this speech coding standard being less used in modern voice recording equipment.

== Operation ==
The DSS file format stores voice audio data in a highly compressed format that allows basic recording functionality (such as recording, playing, rewinding, etc.) as well as the ability to record in either insert or overwrite mode making it ideal for dictation. This along with ability to include additional information in the file header for the transcriptionist including priority mark, author, job type, etc.

DSS is a format designed specifically for speech, equivalent to MP3 for music. In contrast with MP3, however, the quality usually is as low as possible, to minimize the size of the file.

== See also ==
- Speech Processing Solutions
- Philips
- Olympus
- Grundig Business Systems
