= Golden Record =

Golden Record may refer to:

- The Voyager Golden Records, included aboard the Voyager spacecraft by NASA
- The Golden Record, album by the singer Little Scream
- Golden Record (album), album by The Dangerous Summer
- Golden Records, a defunct record label
- Golden record (informatics), or golden copy, an alternative name for the master version of a record in a single source of truth system

== See also ==
- Gold Record (disambiguation)
