= Dictabelt =

Audio recording medium

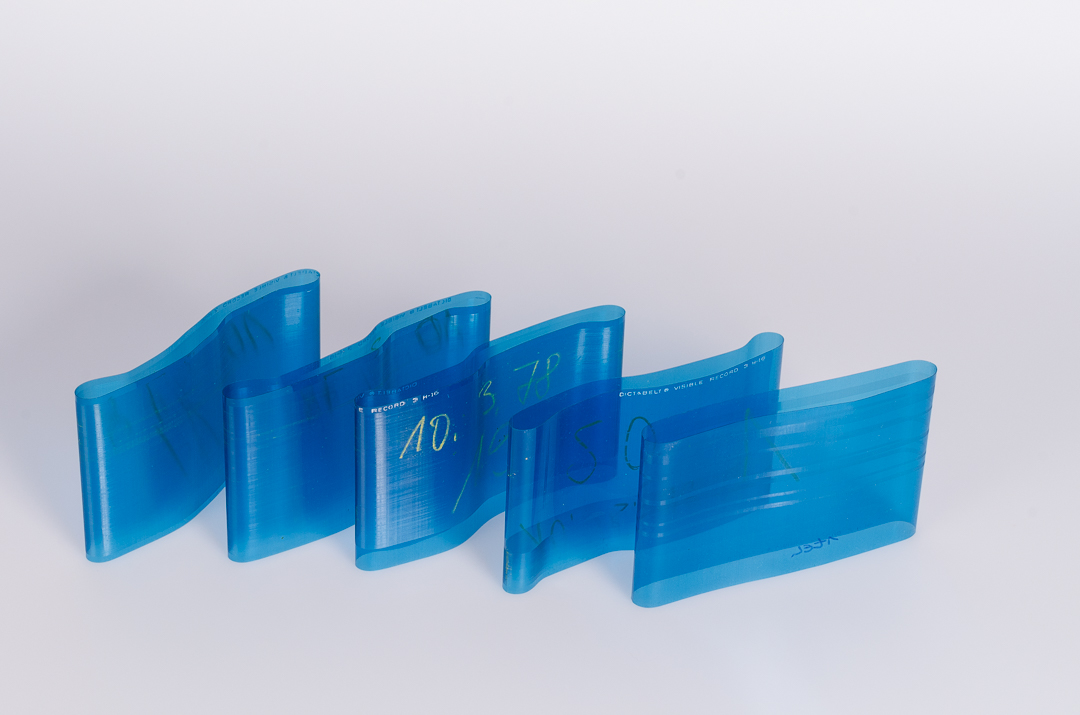
- Media type: Grooved belt
- Encoding: Analog groove modulation
- Capacity: 15 minutes
- Developed by: Dictaphone
- Usage: Dictation, audio storage
- Released: 1947
- Discontinued: c. 1980

The Dictabelt, in early years and much less commonly also called a Memobelt, is an analog audio recording medium commercially introduced by the American Dictaphone company in 1947. Having been intended for recording dictation and other speech for later transcription, it is a write-once-read-many medium consisting of a 5-mil (0.13 mm) thick transparent vinyl (according to a 1960s Dictaphone user manual: cellulose acetate butyrate) plastic belt 3.5 inches (89 mm) wide and 12 inches (300 mm) around. The belt is loaded onto a pair of metal cylinders, put under tension, then rotated like a tank tread. It is inscribed with an audio-signal-modulated helical groove by a stylus which is slowly moved across the rotating belt. Unlike the stylus of a record cutter, the Dictabelt stylus is blunt and in recording mode it simply impresses a groove into the plastic rather than engraving it and throwing off a thread of waste material. The Dictabelt system was popular, and by 1952, made up 90% of Dictaphone's sales.

Dictabelts were more convenient and provide better audio quality than the reusable wax cylinders they replaced. The belts can be folded for storage and will fit into an ordinary letter-size envelope. However, the plastic loses flexibility as it ages. If a belt is stored sharply folded for a long time, it will become permanently creased and unplayable without special treatment. Dictabelts were red until 1964, blue from 1964 to 1975, then purple until they were discontinued around 1980. Each has a capacity of about 15 minutes at the standard speed. At least one Dictaphone model featured a half-speed, low-fidelity 30-minute option.

In the 1960s, Virginia required that all of its circuit courts be outfitted with Dictabelt machines.

Along with a Gray Audograph sound recorder, a Dictabelt recorded the police department radio channels in Dallas, Texas, during the John F. Kennedy assassination. These recordings were reviewed by the United States House Select Committee on Assassinations (HSCA).

== See also ==
- John F. Kennedy assassination Dictabelt recording
