= Lyreco =

Worldwide distributor of office supplies

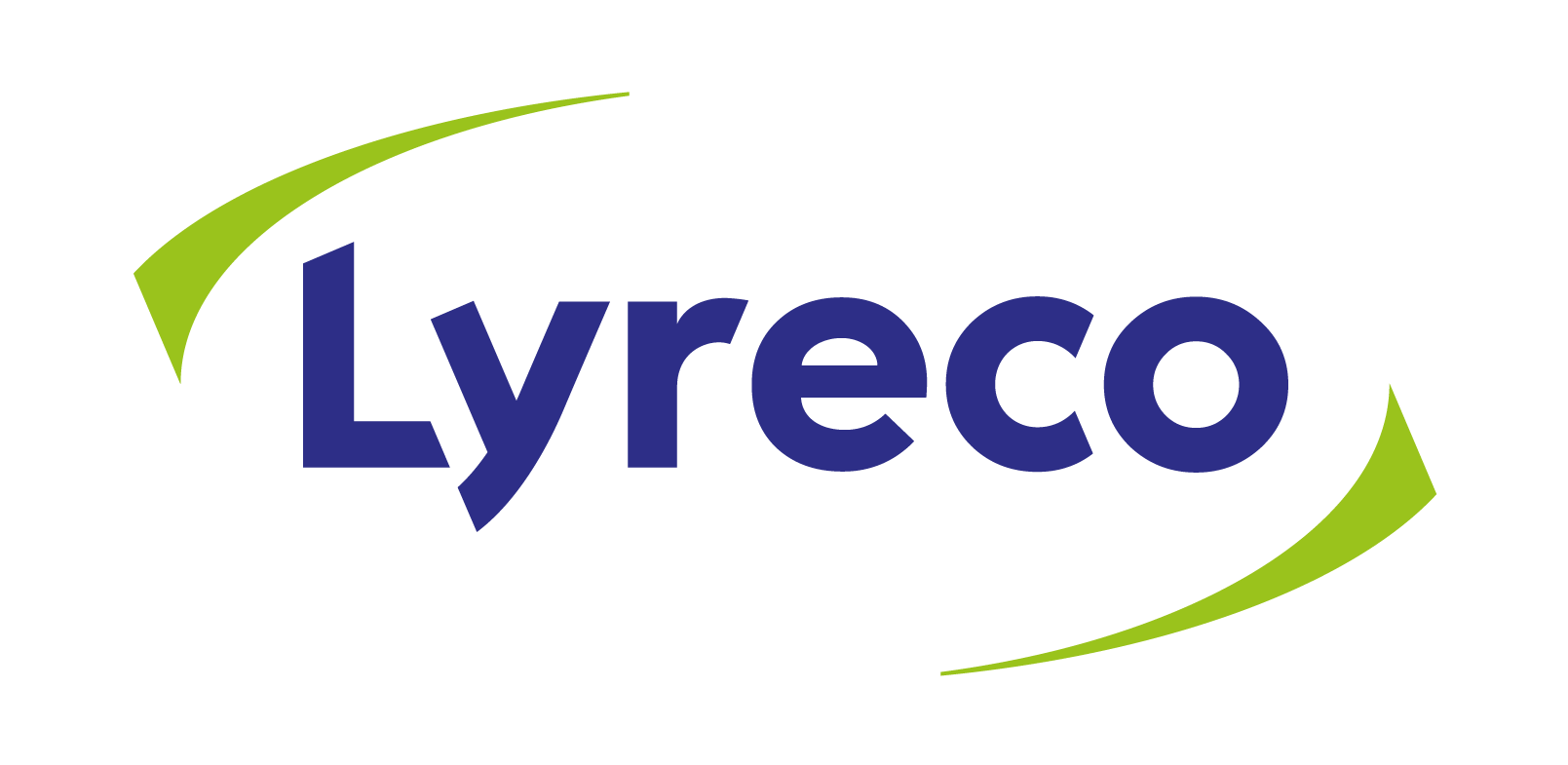
- Type: Privately held company
- Industry: business and other management consulting
- Founded: 1926; 100 years ago
- Headquarters: Marly, France
- Key people: Grégory Liénard - CEO
- Number of employees: 12,000 (2023)
- Website: https://www.lyreco.com/

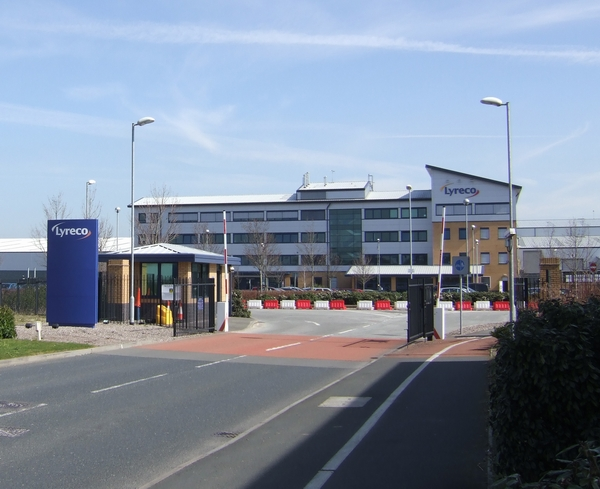
Lyreco Depot in Telford, England (2007)

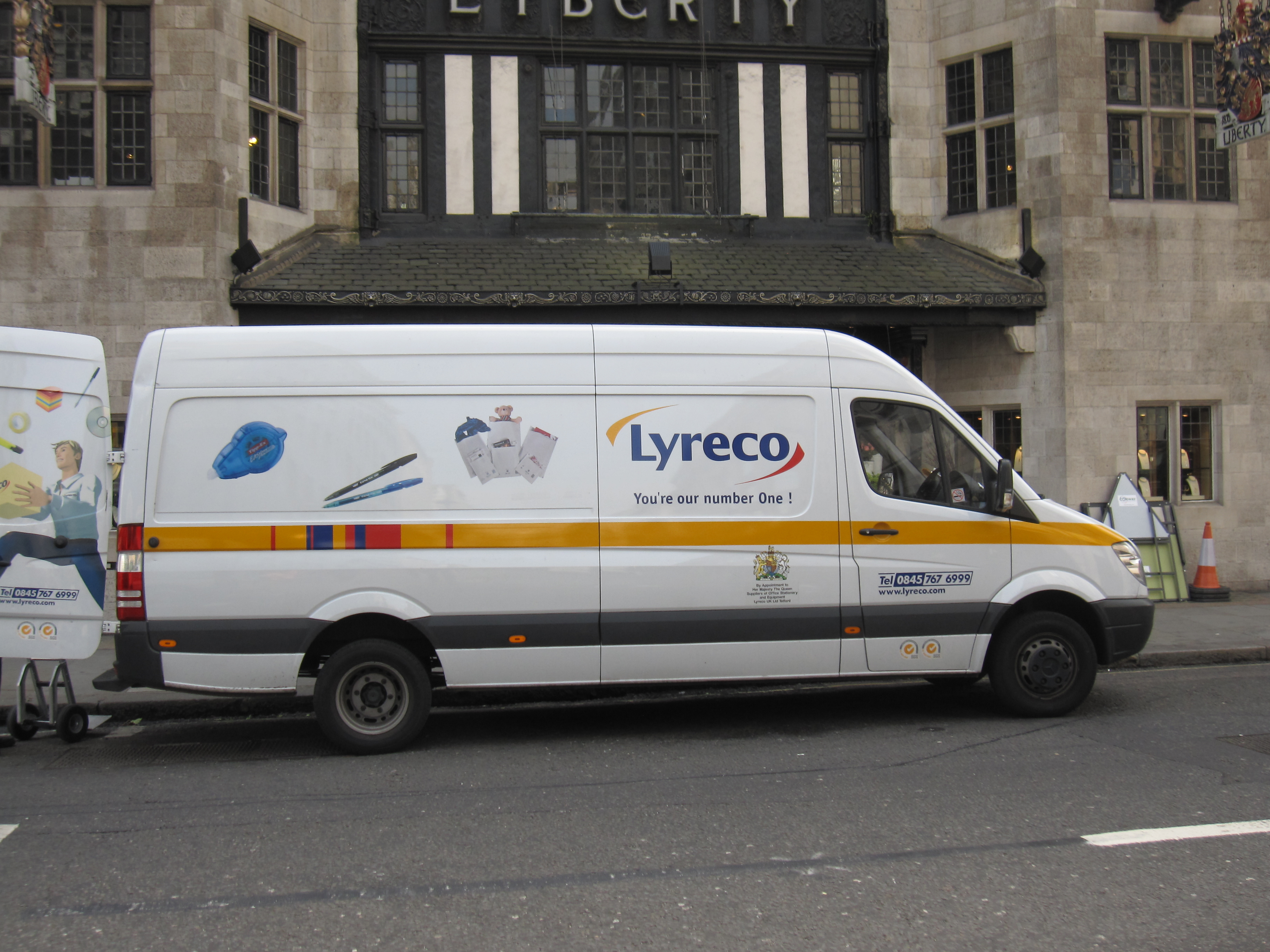

Lyreco is a worldwide distributor of office supplies and workplace services, founded in 1926 by Georges-Gaston Gaspard in the Valenciennes area of France.

The company focused its development on the French territory during the 1970s. In 1989, Lyreco Group acquired its first company outside France, and the Group is now active in 25 countries in Europe and Asia and covers 16 additional markets on 4 continents through a network of distribution partners and employs 12,000 people.

In December 2018, Lyreco diversified. The family Group acquired two companies from the Dutch Broadview Holding: Intersafe, in the Netherlands, and Elacin. Both specialize in personal protective equipment (PPE), from goggles to gas detectors to custom earplugs.

== Products and services ==
The offerings include office supplies, furniture, IT equipment, personal protective equipment, hygiene products, coffee, and catering services.

== History ==
Founded in 1926 by Georges-Gaston Gaspard as a bookstore in Valenciennes, France, the company evolved into a B-to-B provider of office products and services. Under the leadership of Etienne Gaspard and Georges Gaspard, Lyreco expanded internationally with the acquisition of Vermeire in Belgium in 1989. The company rebranded as Lyreco in 2001.
