= Gray Audograph =

Disc-shaped analog sound storage medium

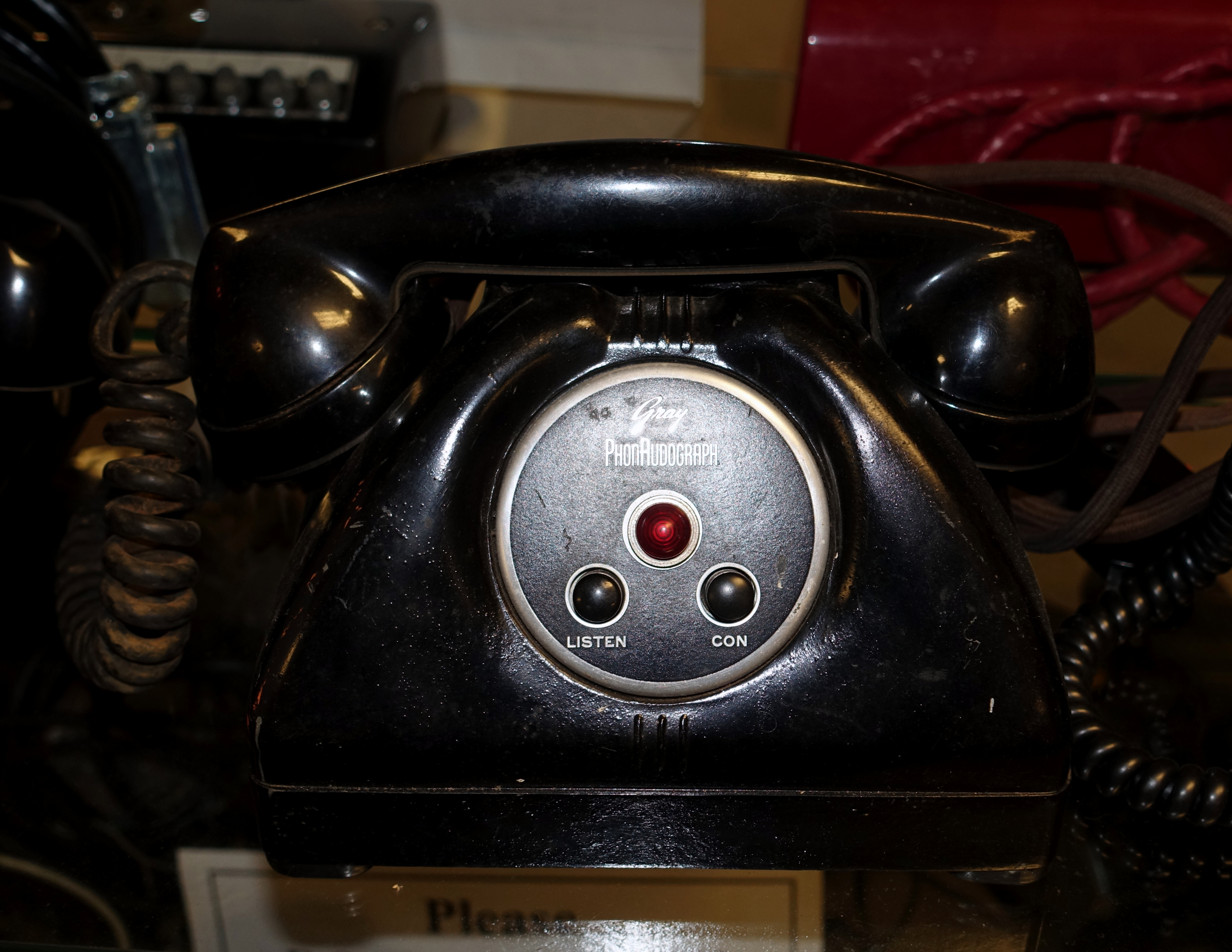
Gray Audograph handset

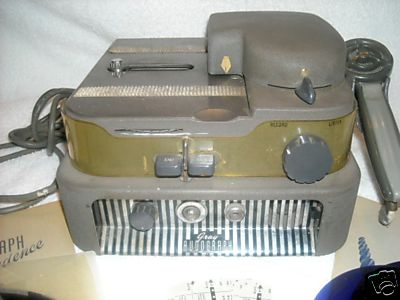
Gray Audograph

The Gray Audograph was a dictation machine format introduced in 1945. It recorded sound by pressing grooves into soft vinyl discs.

The Audograph recorded on thin vinyl discs of 15cm diameter, recording from the inside to the outside, the opposite of conventional gramophone records. Unlike conventional records, the disc was driven by a surface-mounted wheel. This meant that its recording and playback speed decreased toward the edge of the disc (like the Compact Disc and other digital formats), to keep a more constant linear velocity and to improve playing time, which was ten minutes.

In 1950, Gray began to make a variant of the Audograph for AT&T, known as the Peatrophone.
