= Dictation machine =

Device for recording human speech

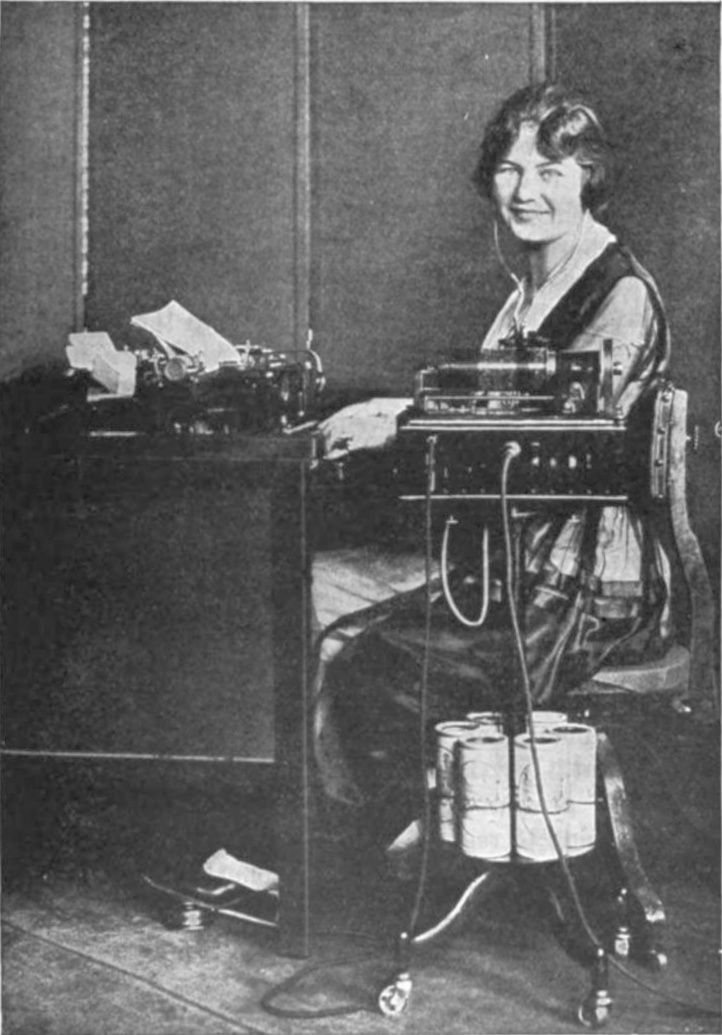
Transcribing dictation with a Dictaphone wax cylinder dictation machine, in the early 1920s. Note supply of extra wax cylinders on lower part of stand.

A dictation machine is a sound recording device most commonly used to record speech for playback or to be typed into print. It includes digital voice recorders and tape recorders.

The name "Dictaphone" is a trademark of the American Graphophone Company, but it has also become a common term for all dictation machines, as a genericized trademark.

== History ==
Alexander Graham Bell, Charles Tainter and Chichester Bell working at A.G. Bell's Volta Laboratory and Bureau they took Edison's tinfoil phonograph and improved it enough to be a commercial success. Critical inventions include using wax as the recording medium instead of tin, and recording side-to-side in the groove instead of up-and-down.

They began their work at Volta in 1879, and continued until they were granted basic patents in 1886 for recording in wax.

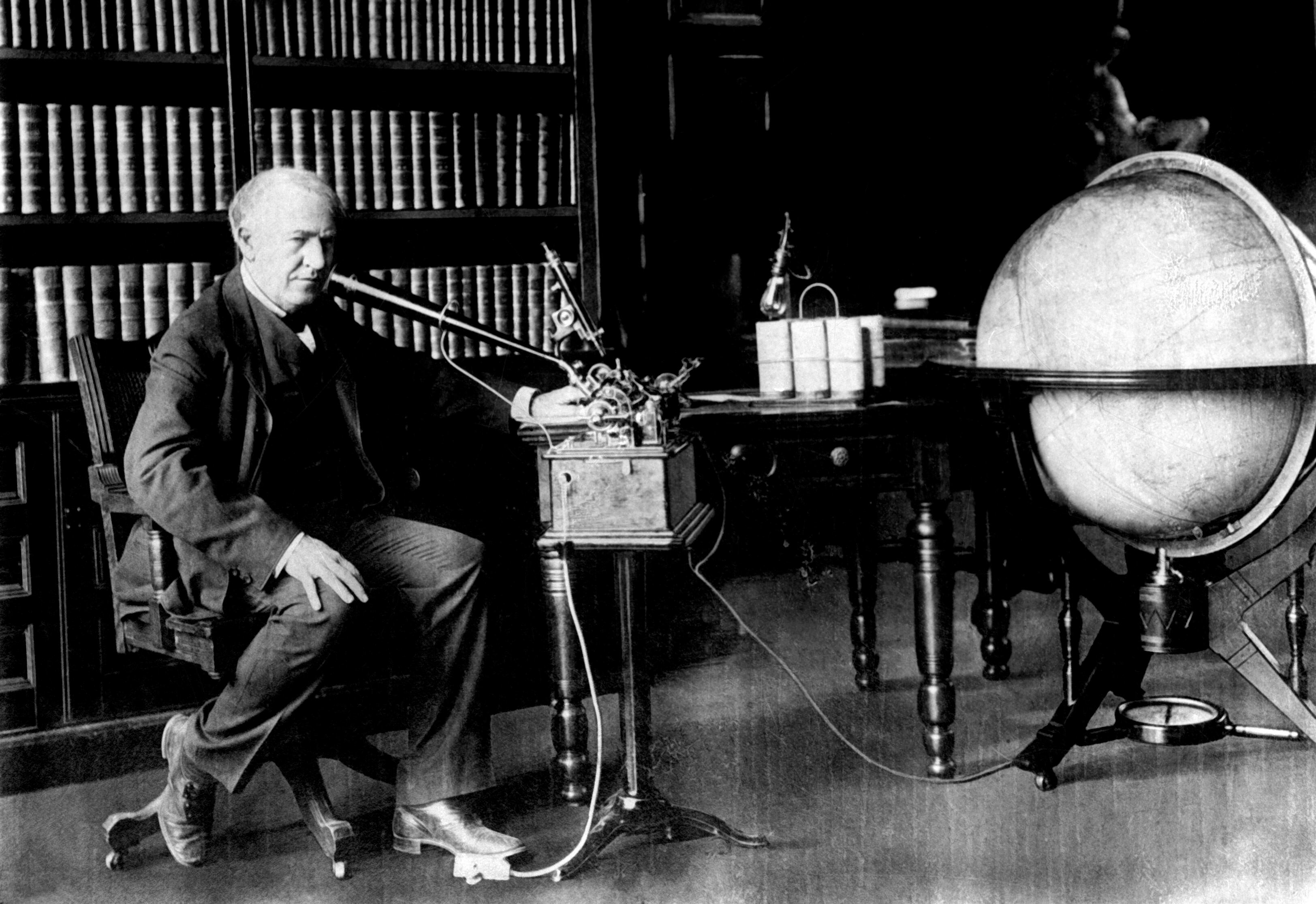
Thomas A. Edison dictating in 1907

Thomas A. Edison had invented the phonograph in 1877, but the fame bestowed on him for this invention — sometimes called his most original — was not due to its efficiency. Recording with his tinfoil phonograph was too difficult to be practical, as the tinfoil tore easily, even when the stylus was properly adjusted.

Edison had hit upon the secret of sound recording, an immense breakthrough, But he did not improve on his original technology, which was too difficult to use for commercial success. The difficulty in using it was the removable film of tinfoil which was the actual recording medium, and which was prone to damage during installation or removal. It is said Edison laid aside work on the phonograph, because of an agreement to spend the next five years developing the New York City electric light and power systems.

By 1881 Volta had success in improving an Edison tinfoil machine, with innovations coming primarily from using wax as the recording medium. The wax was put in the grooves of a heavy iron cylinder, and cutting, or 'engraving', the sound waves into the wax with a sharp recording stylus. This cutting stylus created lateral, zig-zag grooves, of uniform depth into the wax, rather than the up-down vertically-cut grooves of Edison's contemporary phonograph machine designs.

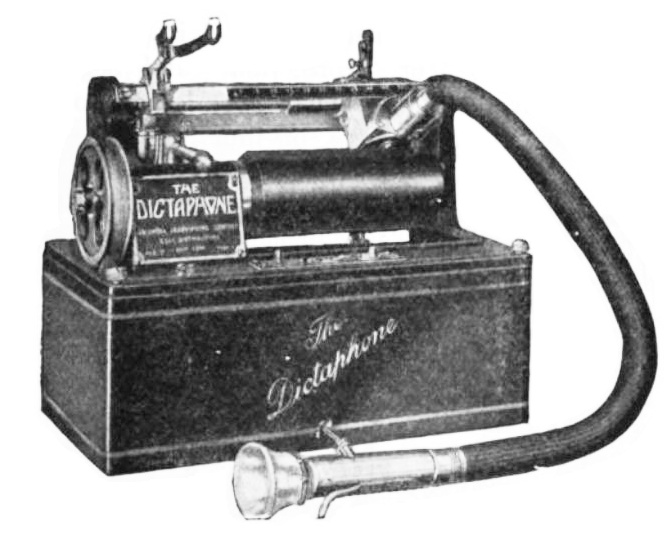
Dictaphone cylinder dictation machine from the early 1920s

Volta developed wax-coated cardboard cylinders for their record cylinders, instead of Edison's cast iron cylinder Tainter received a separate patent for a tube assembly machine to automatically produce the coiled cardboard tubes.

Besides being far easier to handle, the wax recording medium also allowed for lengthier recordings and created superior playback quality.

Additionally the Graphophones initially deployed foot treadles to rotate the recordings, instead of the manual crank that was used on Edison's phonograph, making them easier to operate. Later Graphophones used wind-up clockwork drive mechanisms. The numerous improvements allowed for a sound quality that was significantly better than Edison's machine.

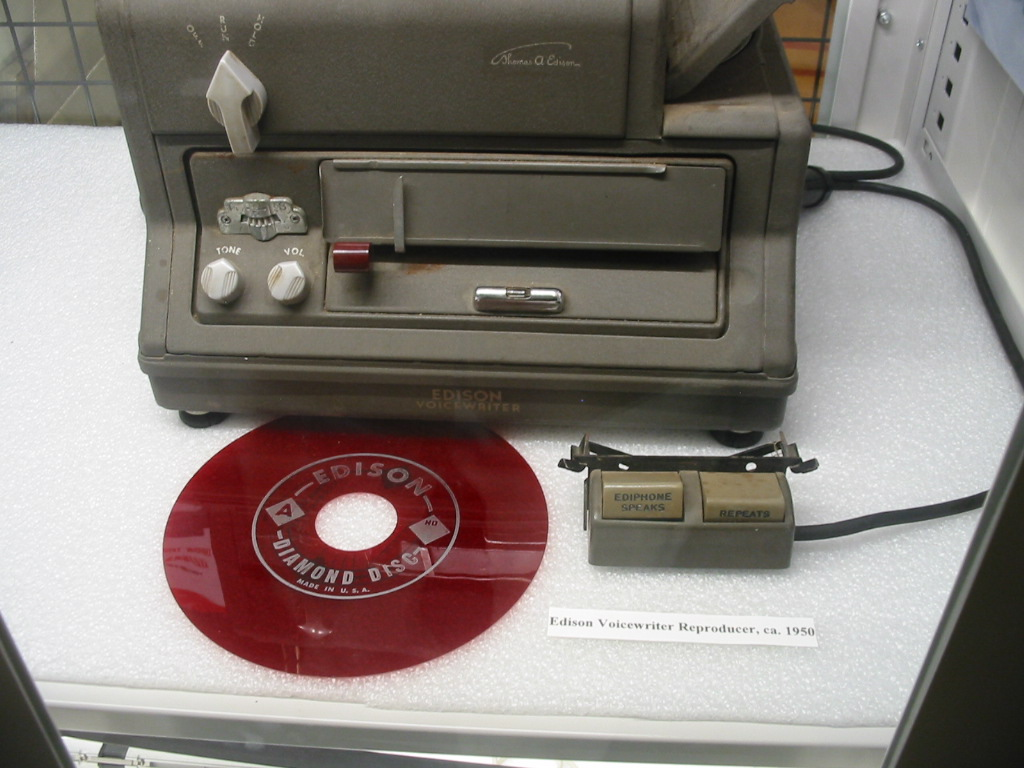
Edison Voicewriter from about 1950

Edison thought that the main use for the new device would be for recording speech in business settings. Some early phonographs were indeed used this way, but this did not become common until the production of reusable wax cylinders in the late 1880s, as described. The differentiation of office dictation devices from other early phonographs, which commonly had attachments for making one's own recordings, was gradual. The machine marketed by the Edison Records company was trademarked as the "Ediphone".

Following the invention of the audion tube in 1906, electric microphones gradually replaced the purely acoustical recording methods of earlier dictaphones by the late 1930s. In 1945, the SoundScriber, Gray Audograph and Edison Voicewriter, which cut grooves into a plastic disc, was introduced, and two years later Dictaphone replaced wax cylinders with their Dictabelt technology, which cut a mechanical groove into a plastic belt instead of into a wax cylinder. This was later replaced by magnetic tape recording. While reel-to-reel tape was used for dictation, the inconvenience of threading tape spools led to development of more convenient formats, notably the Compact Cassette, Mini-Cassette, and Microcassette.

== Digital dictation ==
Digital dictation became possible in the 1990s, as falling computer memory prices made possible pocket-sized digital voice recorders that stored sound on computer memory chips without moving parts. Many early 21st-century digital cameras and smartphones have this capability built in. In the 1990s, improvements in voice recognition technology began to allow computers to transcribe recorded audio dictation into text form, a task that previously required human secretaries or transcribers.

The files generated with digital recorders vary in size, depending on the manufacturer and the format the user chooses. The most common file formats that digital recorders generate have one of the extensions WAV, WMA and MP3. Many dictation machines record in the DSS and DS2 format. Dictation audio can be recorded in various audio file formats. Most digital dictation systems use a lossy form of audio compression based on modelling of the vocal tract to minimize hard disk space and optimize network utilization as files are transferred between users. (Note that WAV is not an audio encoding format, but a file format and has little or no bearing on the encoding rate (kbit/s), size or audio quality of the resulting file.)

Digital dictation offers several advantages over traditional cassette tape based dictation:

- The user can instantly rewind or fast forward to any point within the dictation file to review or edit.
- The random access ability of digital audio allows inserting audio at any point without overwriting the following text.
- Dictation produces a file which can be transferred electronically, e.g. via WAN, LAN, USB, e-mail, telephony, FTP, etc.
- Large dictation files can be shared with multiple typists.
- Sound may be CD quality and can improve transcription accuracy and speed.
- Digital dictation provides the ability to report on the volume or type of dictation and transcription outstanding or completed within an organization.

Despite the advances in technology, analog media are still widely used in dictation recording due to its flexibility, permanence, and robustness. In some cases, speech is recorded where sound quality is paramount and transcription unnecessary, e.g. for broadcasting a theatre play; recording techniques closer to high-fidelity music recording are more appropriate.

=== Methods ===
==== Portable recorder ====
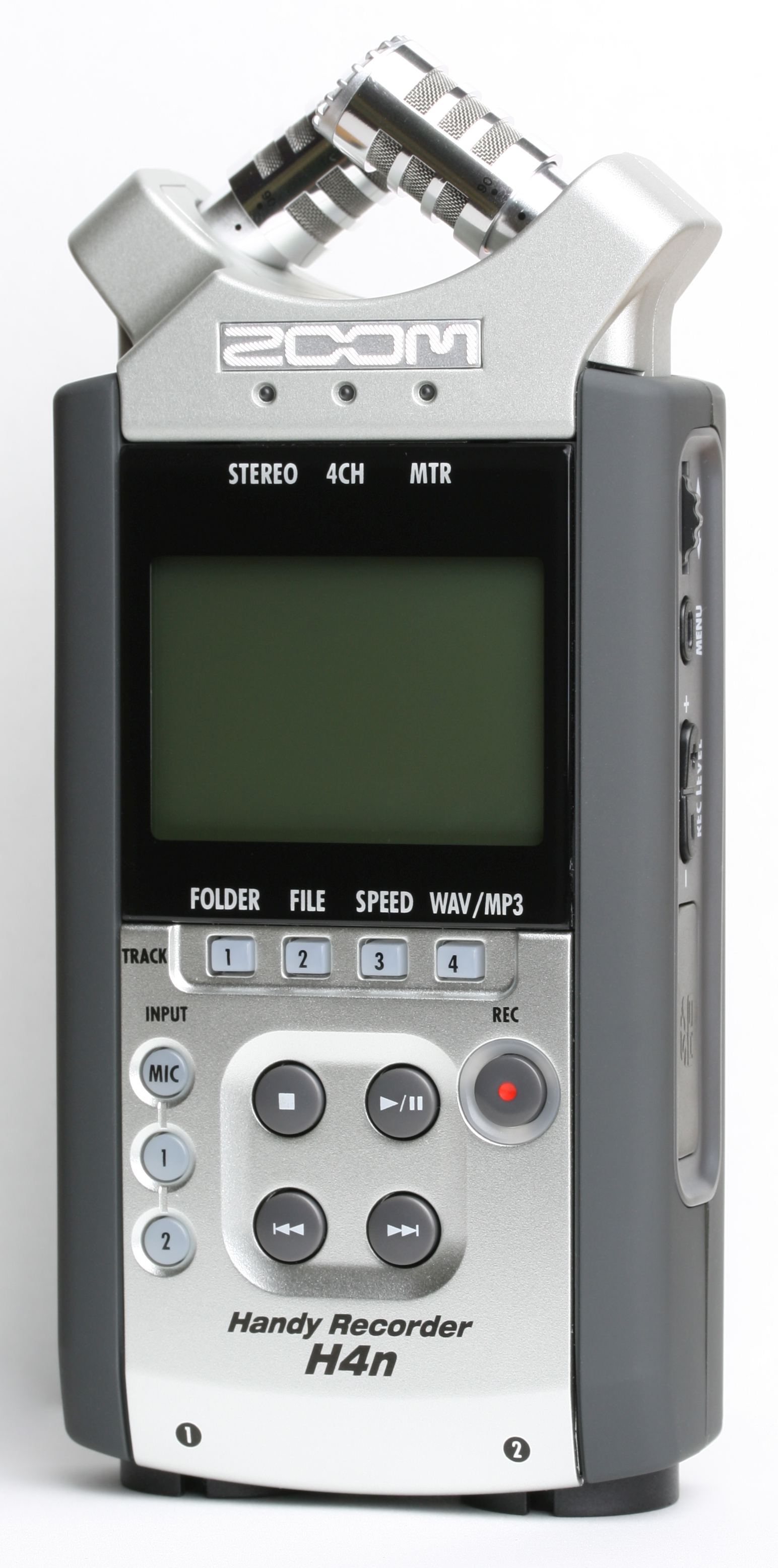
Digital portable recorder

Portable, hand held, digital recorders are the modern replacement for along with handhelds. Digital portables allow transfer of recordings by docking or plugging into a computer. Digital recorders eliminate the need for cassette tapes. Professional digital hand held recorders are available with slide switch, push button, fingerprint locking, and barcode scanning options.

==== Computer ====
Another common way to record digital dictation is with a computer dictation microphone. There are several different types of computer dictation microphones available, but each one has similar features and operation. Olympus Direct Rec, Philips SpeechMike, and Dictaphone Powermic are all digital computer dictation microphones that also feature push button control for operating dictation or speech recognition software. The dictation microphone operates through a USB on the computer it is used with.

==== Call-in dictation system ====
Call-in dictation systems allow one to record their dictations over the phone. With call in dictation systems, the author dials a phone number, enters a PIN and starts dictating. Touch tone controls allow for start, pause, playback, and sending of dictation audio file. The call-in dictation systems usually feature a Pod that can be plugged into a phone line. The pod can then be plugged into a computer to store dictation audio recording in compatible transcription or management software.

==== Mobile phone ====
Currently, there are several digital dictation applications available for mobile phones. With mobile dictation apps, one can record, edit, and send dictation files over networks. Wireless transfer of dictation files decreases turnaround time. Mobile dictation applications allow users to stay connected to dictation workflows through a network, such as the Internet.

=== Software ===
There are two types of digital dictation software:

1. Standalone digital sound recording software: Basic software whereby the audio is recorded as a simple file. Most digital sound recording applications are designed for individuals or a very small number of users, as they do not offer a network efficient way of transferring the audio files other than email, they also do not encrypt or password protect the audio file
2. Digital dictation workflow software: Advanced software for commercial organizations where audio is still played by a typist but the audio file can be securely and efficiently transferred. The workflow element of these advanced systems also allows users to share audio files instantly, create virtual teams, outsource transcription securely, and set up confidential send options or 'ethical walls'. Digital Dictation workflow software is normally Active Directory integrated and can be used in conjunction with document, practice or case management systems. Typical businesses using workflow software are law firms, healthcare organizations, accountancies or surveying firms.

Recordings can be made over the telephone, on a computer or via a hand held dictation device that is "docked" to a computer.

=== Transcription ===
Digital dictation is different from speech recognition where audio is analyzed by a computer using speech algorithms in an attempt to transcribe the document. With digital dictation the process of converting digital audio to text may be done using digital transcription software, typically controlled by a foot switch which allows the transcriber to PLAY, STOP, REWIND, and BACKSPACE. Nevertheless, there are Digital Transcription Kits that allow integration with Speech Recognition Software. This gives the typist the option to either type a document manually, or send a document to be converted to text by Software such as Dragon NaturallySpeaking.

== Common dictation formats ==
- Phonograph cylinder (1890s)
- Gray Audograph (1945)
- SoundScriber (1945)
- Edison Voicewriter (late 1940s)
- Dictabelt (1947)
- Compact Cassette (1963)
- Mini-Cassette (1967)
- Microcassette (1969)
- Digital dictation (1990s)

== See also ==
- Digital pen
- IBM dictation machines
- Speech recognition
- Volta Laboratory and Bureau
