= Cassette tape =

Magnetic audio tape recording format

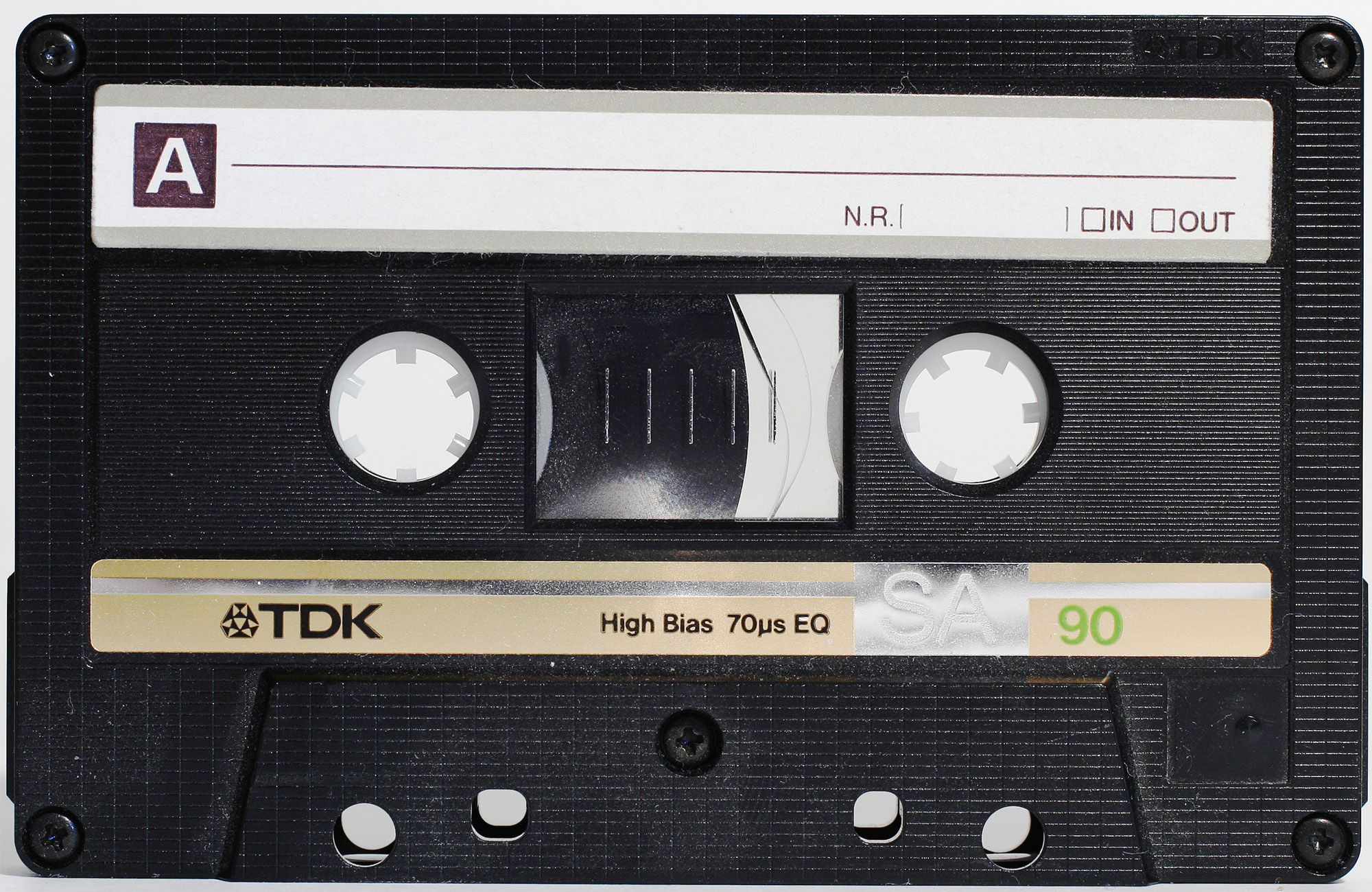
- A TDK SA90 Type II Compact Cassette
- Media type: Magnetic tape cassette
- Encoding: Analog signal, in four tracks
- Capacity: Most commonly 30, 45, or 60 minutes per side (C60, C90, and C120)
- Read mechanism: Tape head
- Write mechanism: Tape head
- Developed by: Philips
- Usage: Audio and data storage
- Extended from: Reel-to-reel audio tape recording
- Extended to: Digital Compact Cassette
- Released: August 1963; 63 years ago

The cassette tape, officially named the Compact Cassette, and also known as audio cassette, or simply tape or cassette, is an analog magnetic tape recording format for audio recording and playback. Invented by Lou Ottens and his team at the Dutch company Philips, the Compact Cassette was introduced in August 1963, and Philips freely licensed the patented format to other manufacturers from 1966.

Cassette tapes come in two forms, either containing content as a pre-recorded cassette (such as a Musicassette), or as a fully recordable "blank" cassette. Both forms have two sides and are reversible by the user. Although other tape cassette formats have also existed—for example the Microcassette—the generic term cassette tape is normally used to refer to the Compact Cassette because of its ubiquity.

The Compact Cassette format was initially developed for dictation purposes. When Dolby B noise-reduction technology started to become commonplace in the mid-1970s, reducing tape hiss, the cassette became suitable for high fidelity audio, leading to it being widely adopted by the music industry. From 1983 to 1991, the cassette tape was the most popular audio format for new music sales in the United States.

Cassette tapes contain two miniature spools, between which the magnetically coated, polyester-type plastic film (magnetic tape) is passed and wound—essentially miniaturizing reel-to-reel audio tape and enclosing it, with its reels, in a small case (cartridge)—hence "cassette". These spools and their attendant parts are held inside a protective plastic shell which is 4 in × 2.5 in × 0.5 in (10.2 cm × 6.35 cm × 1.27 cm) at its largest dimensions. The tape itself is commonly referred to as "eighth-inch" tape, supposedly 3.175 mm (0.125 in) wide, but actually slightly larger, at 3.81 mm (0.15 in). Two stereo pairs of tracks (four total) or two monaural audio tracks are available on the tape; one stereo pair or one monophonic track is played or recorded when the tape is moving in one direction and the second (pair) when moving in the other direction. This reversal is achieved either by manually flipping the cassette when the tape comes to an end, or by the reversal of tape movement, known as "auto-reverse", when the mechanism detects that the tape has ended.

== History ==
=== Precursors ===
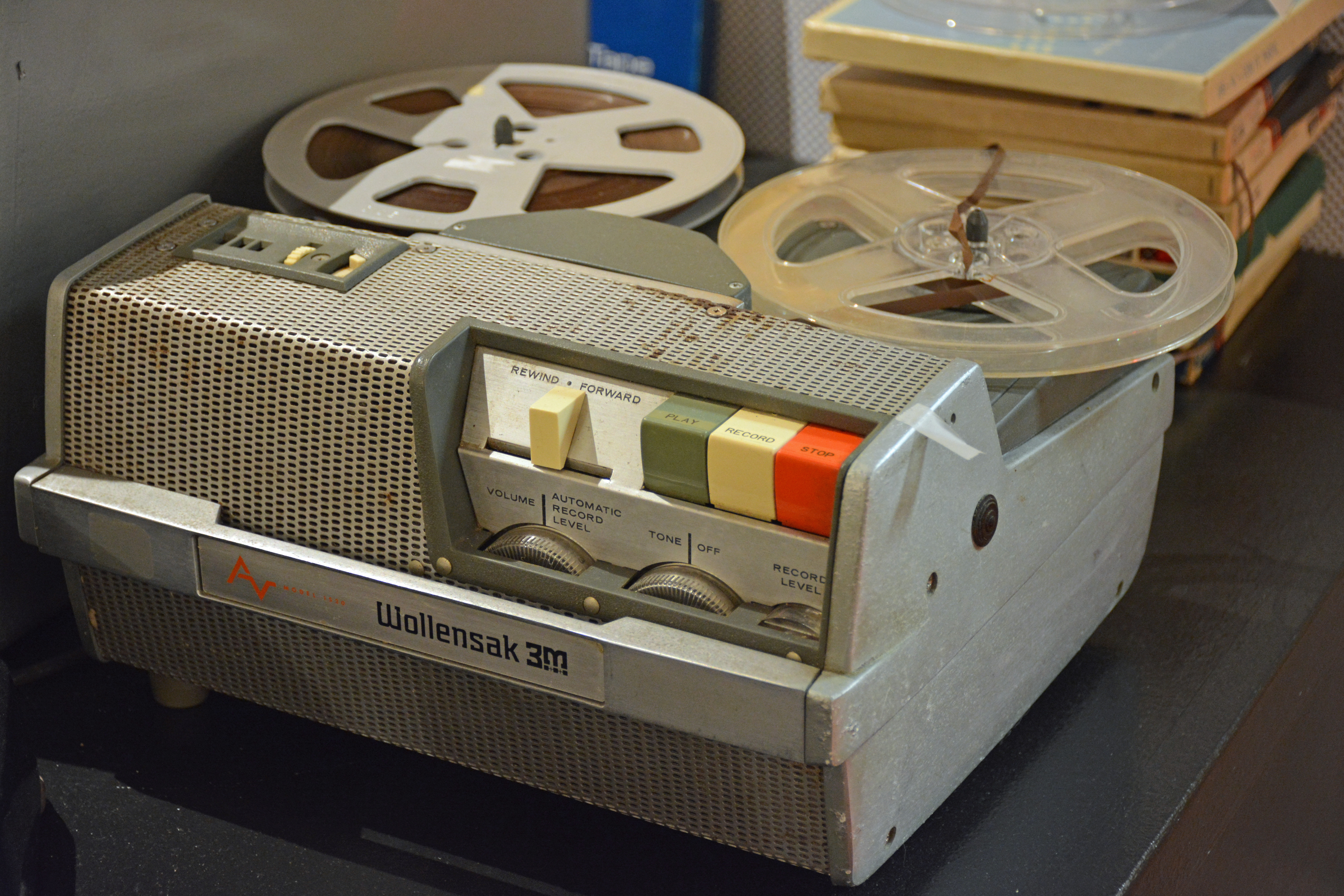
Wollensak portable reel-to-reel tape recorder

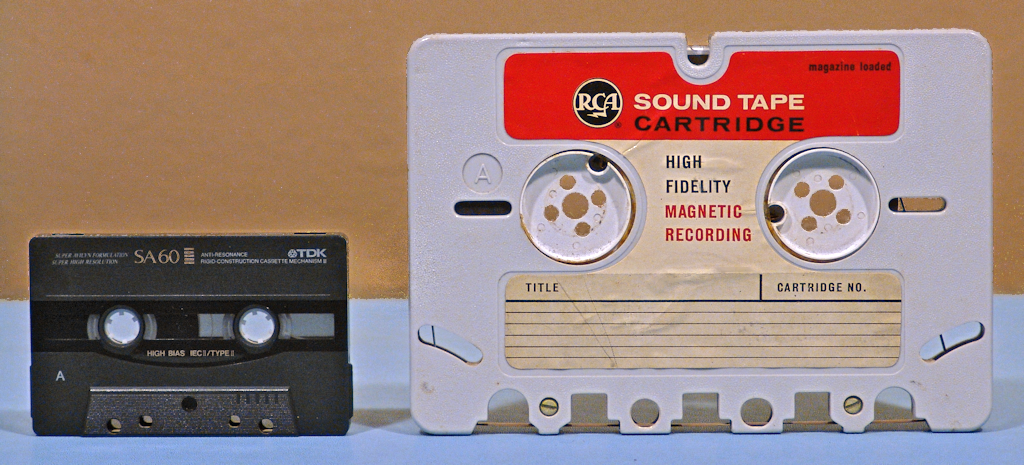
Compact Cassette vs. RCA Tape Cartridge

After the Second World War, magnetic tape recording technology proliferated across the world. In the United States, Ampex, using equipment obtained in Germany as a starting point, began commercial production of reel-to-reel tape recorders. First used by broadcast studios to pre-record radio programs, tape recorders quickly found their way into schools and homes. By 1953, one million U.S. homes had tape machines, and several major record labels were releasing select titles on pre-recorded reel-to-reel tapes.

In 1958, following four years of development, RCA Victor introduced the RCA tape cartridge, which enclosed 60 minutes (30 minutes per side) of stereo quarter-inch reel-to-reel tape within a plastic cartridge that could be utilized on a compatible tape recorder/player without having to thread the tape through the machine. This format was not very successful, and RCA discontinued it in 1964.

=== Development and release ===
Operating instructions for the Philips/Norelco Cartridge Tape Carry-Corder 150 (1964)

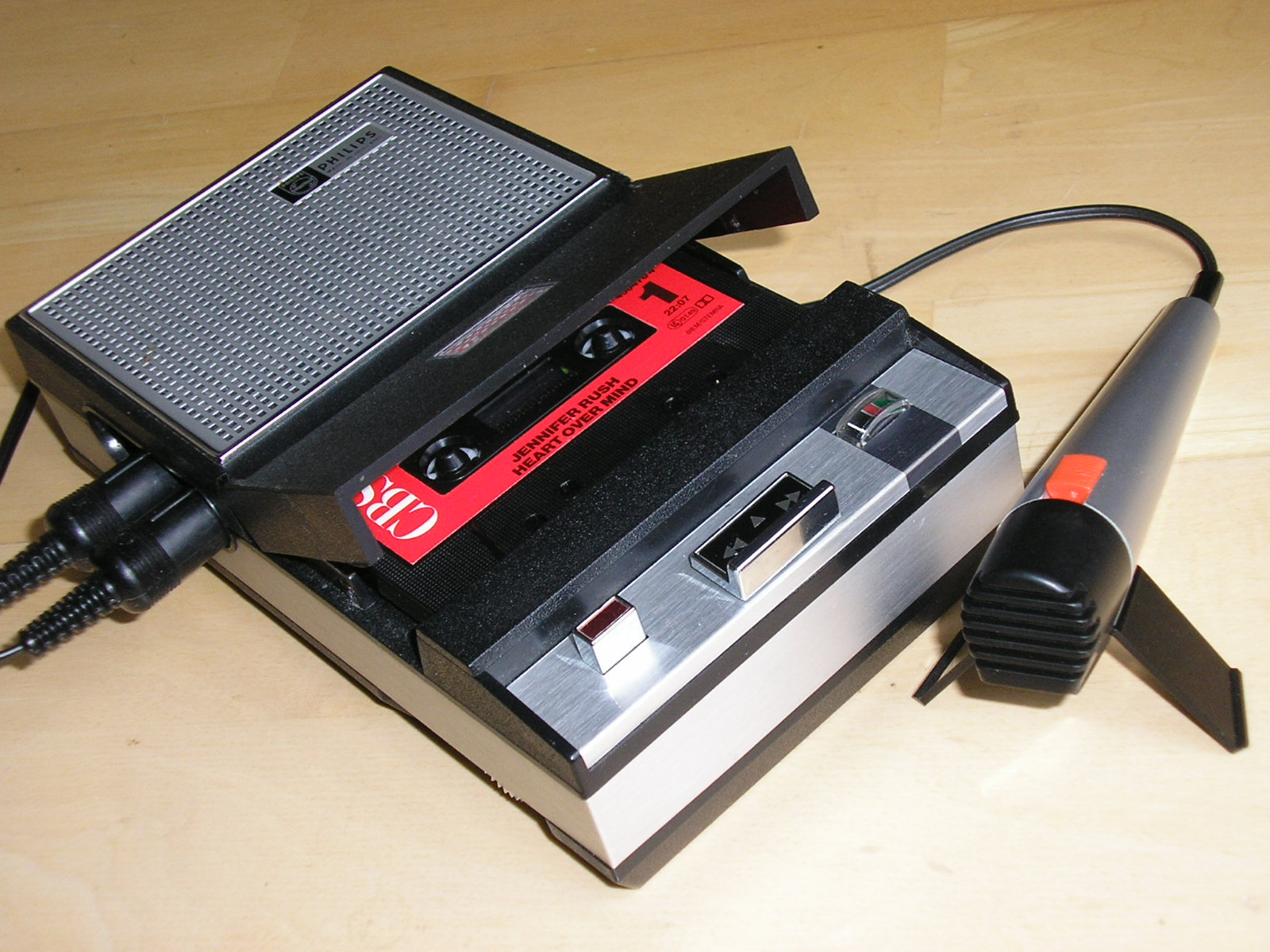
One of the first cassette recorders from Philips, the Typ EL 3302 (1968)

In the early 1960s, Philips tasked two teams to design a high-quality tape cartridge for home use, using thinner and narrower tape than that used in reel-to-reel tape recorders. A team at its Vienna factory, which had experience with dictation machines, developed the Einloch-Kassette, or single-hole cassette, with Grundig. At the same time, a team in Hasselt led by Lou Ottens developed a two-hole cassette under the name Pocket Recorder.

Philips selected the two-spool cartridge as a winner and introduced the 2-track 2-direction mono version in Europe on 28 August 1963 at the Berlin Radio Show, and in the United States (under the Norelco brand) in November 1964. The same year, mass production of blank compact cassettes began in Hanover. Philips also offered a machine to play and record the cassettes, the Philips Typ EL 3300. An updated model, Typ EL 3301 was offered in the U.S. in November 1964 as Norelco Carry-Corder 150. The trademark name Compact Cassette came a year later.

Following rejection of the Einloch-Kassette, Grundig developed the DC-International (DC standing for Double Cassette) based on drawings of the Compact Cassette, introducing it in 1965 as companies were competing to establish their format as the worldwide standard. After yielding to pressure from Sony to license the Compact Cassette format to them free of charge, Philips' format achieved market dominance, with the DC-International cassette format being discontinued in 1967, just two years after its introduction.

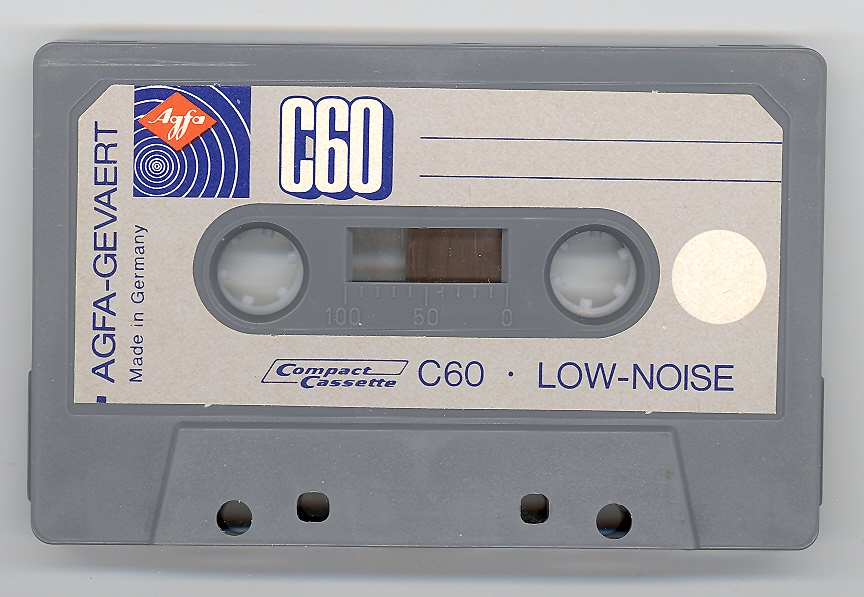
An Agfa-Gevaert Low-Noise blank cassette. The opaque shell with distinctive oval and small window with written timing scale (100 50 0) are typical characteristics of earlier cassette shell designs of the 1960s and 1970s.

Philips improved on the Compact Cassette's original design to release a stereo version. By 1966 over 250,000 compact cassette recorders had been sold in the U.S. alone. Japanese manufacturers soon became the leading source of recorders. By 1968, 85 manufacturers had sold over 2.4 million mono and stereo units. By the end of the 1960s, the cassette business was worth an estimated $150 million, and by the early 1970s compact cassette machines were outselling other types of tape machines by a large margin.

=== Popularity of music cassettes ===
Pre-recorded music cassettes (also known as Music-Cassettes, and later just Musicassettes) were launched in Europe in late 1965. The Mercury Record Company, a US affiliate of Philips, introduced Musicassettes to the US in July 1966. The initial offering consisted of 49 titles.

The compact cassette format was initially designed for dictation and portable use, and the audio quality of early players was not well-suited for music. In 1971, the Advent Corporation introduced their Model 201 tape deck that combined Dolby type B noise reduction and chromium(IV) oxide (CrO_{2}) tape, with a commercial-grade tape transport mechanism supplied by the Wollensak camera division of 3M Corporation. This resulted in the format being taken more seriously for musical use, and started the era of high fidelity cassettes and players.

British record labels began releasing Musicassettes in October 1967, and they exploded as a mass-market medium after the first Walkman, the TPS-L2, went on sale on 1 July 1979, as cassettes provided portability, which vinyl records could not. While portable radios and boom boxes had been around for some time, the Walkman was the first truly personal portable music player, one that not only allowed users to listen to music away from home, but to do so in private. According to the technology news website The Verge, "the world changed" on the day the TPS-L2 was released. Stereo tape decks and boom boxes became some of the most highly sought-after consumer products of both decades, as the ability of users to take their music with them anywhere with ease led to its popularity around the globe.

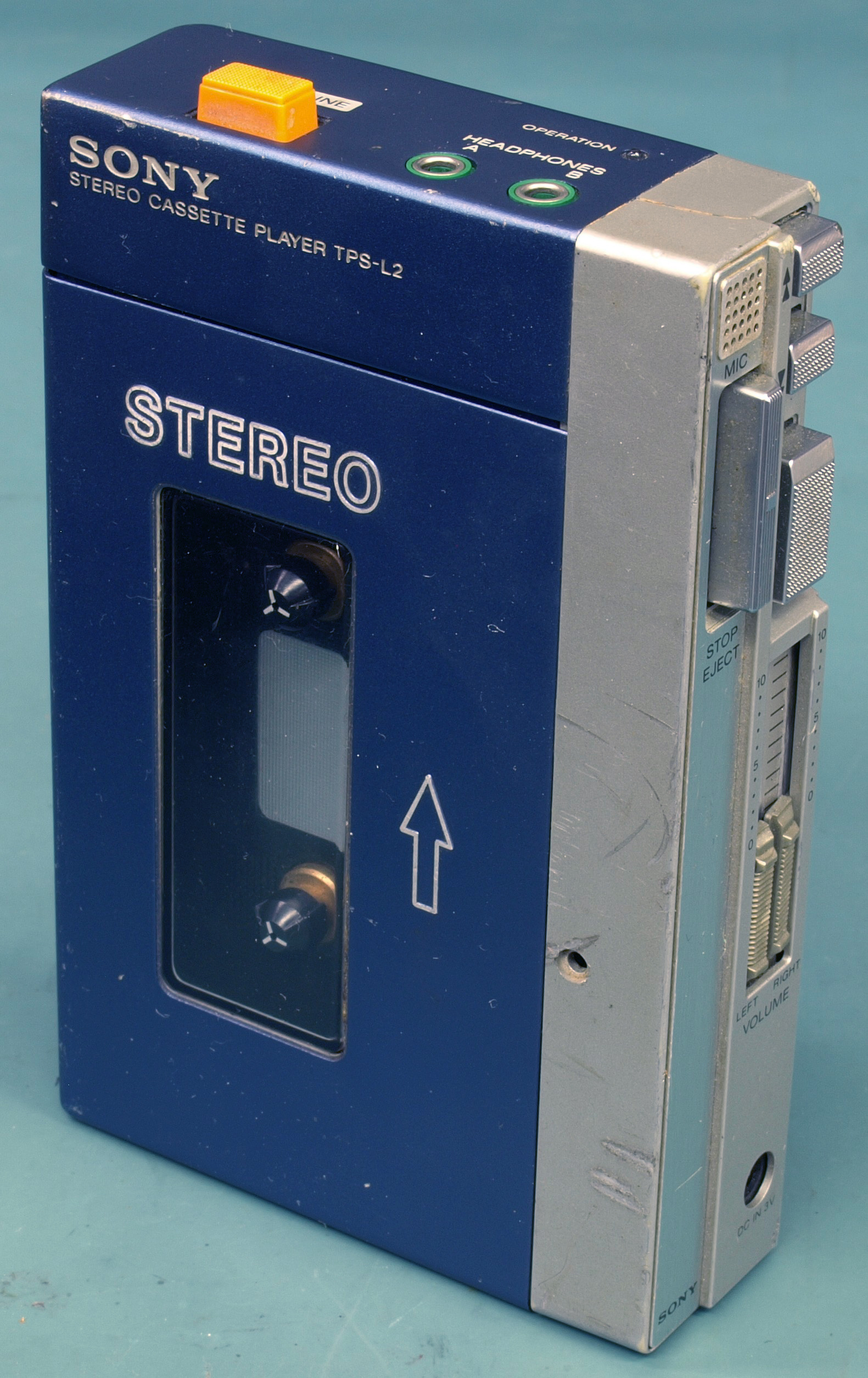
The Sony Walkman TPS-L2

Like the transistor radio in the 1950s and 1960s, the portable CD player in the 1990s, and the MP3 player in the 2000s, the Walkman defined the portable music market for the decade of the '80s, with cassette sales overtaking those of LPs. Total vinyl record sales remained higher well into the 1980s due to greater sales of singles, although cassette singles achieved popularity for a period in the 1990s. Another barrier to cassettes overtaking vinyl in sales was shoplifting; compact cassettes were small enough that a thief could easily place one inside a pocket and walk out of a shop without being noticed. To prevent this, retailers in the US would place cassettes inside oversized "spaghetti box" containers or locked display cases, either of which would significantly inhibit browsing, thus reducing cassette sales.

During the early 1980s some record labels sought to solve this problem by introducing new, larger packages for cassettes which would allow them to be displayed alongside vinyl records and compact discs, or giving them a further market advantage over vinyl by adding bonus tracks. Willem Andriessen wrote that the development in technology allowed "hardware designers to discover and satisfy one of the collective desires of human beings all over the world, independent of region, climate, religion, culture, race, sex, age and education: the desire to enjoy music at any time, at any place, in any desired sound quality and almost at any wanted price". Critic Robert Palmer, writing in The New York Times in 1981, cited the proliferation of personal stereos as well as extra tracks not available on LP as reasons for the surge in popularity of cassettes.

Cassettes' ability to allow users to record content in public also led to a boom in bootleg cassettes made at live shows in the 1980s. The Walkman dominated the decade, selling up to 350 million units. So synonymous did the name "Walkman" become with all portable music players—with a German dictionary at one point defining the term as such without reference to Sony—that the Austrian Supreme Court ruled in 2002 that Sony, which had not sought to have the publisher of that dictionary retract that definition, could not prevent other companies from using that name, as it had now become genericized. As a result of this, a number of Sony's competitors produced their own version of the Walkman. Others made their own branded tape players, like JVC, Panasonic, Sharp, and Aiwa, the second-largest producer of the devices.

Between 1983, when cassettes overtook vinyl, and 1992, when they were overtaken by CDs the cassette tape was the most popular format in the United States and the UK. Record labels experimented with innovative packaging designs. A designer during the era, Brian Cannon, explained: "There was so much money in the industry at the time, we could try anything with design". The introduction of the cassette single, called a cassingle, was also part of this era and featured a music single in Compact Cassette form. Until 2005, cassettes remained the dominant medium for purchasing and listening to music in some developing countries, but compact disc (CD) technology had superseded the Compact Cassette in the vast majority of music markets throughout the world by this time.

=== Cassette culture ===
Compact cassettes served as catalysts for social change. Their small size, durability and ease of copying helped bring underground rock and punk music behind the Iron Curtain, creating a foothold for Western culture among the younger generations. Likewise, in Egypt cassettes empowered an unprecedented number of people to create culture, circulate information, and challenge ruling regimes before the internet became publicly accessible.

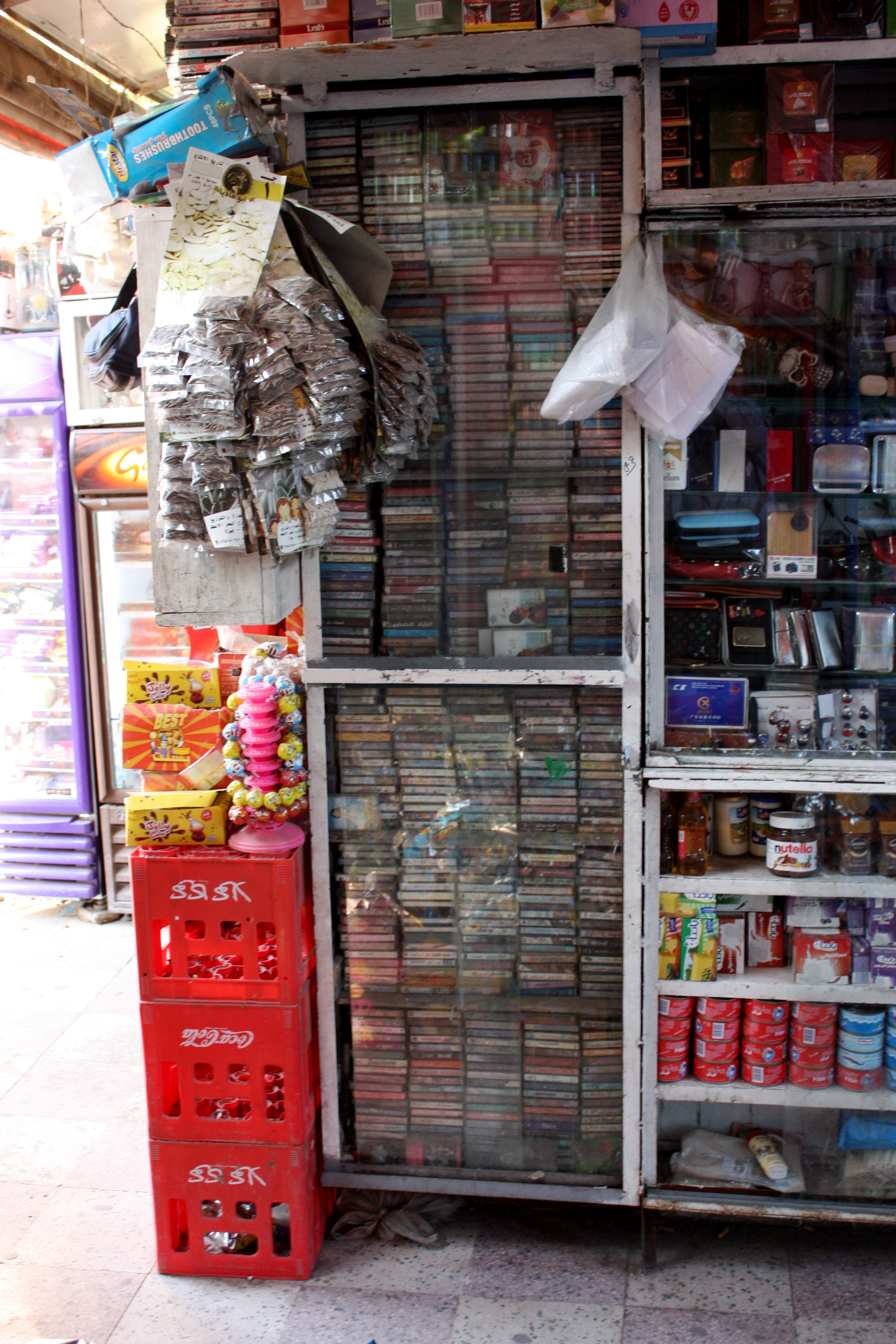
Cassettes at a Cairo Kiosk (2015)

One of the political uses of cassette tapes was the dissemination of sermons by the exiled Ayatollah Khomeini throughout Iran before the 1979 Iranian Revolution, in which Khomeini urged the overthrow of the regime of the Shah, Mohammad Reza Pahlavi. During the military dictatorship of Chile (1973–1990) a "cassette culture" emerged where blacklisted music or music that was by other reasons not available as records was shared. Some pirate cassette producers created brands such as Cumbre y Cuatro that have in retrospect received praise for their contributions to popular music. Armed groups such as Manuel Rodríguez Patriotic Front (FPMR) and the Revolutionary Left Movement (MIR) made use of cassettes to spread their messages.

Cassette technology was a booming market for pop music in India, drawing criticism from conservatives while at the same time creating a huge market for legitimate recording companies, as well as pirated tapes. Some sales channels were associated with cassettes: in Spain filling stations often featured a display selling cassettes. While offering also mainstream music these cassettes became associated with genres such as Gipsy rhumba, light music and joke tapes that were common in the 1970s and 1980s.

=== Decline ===
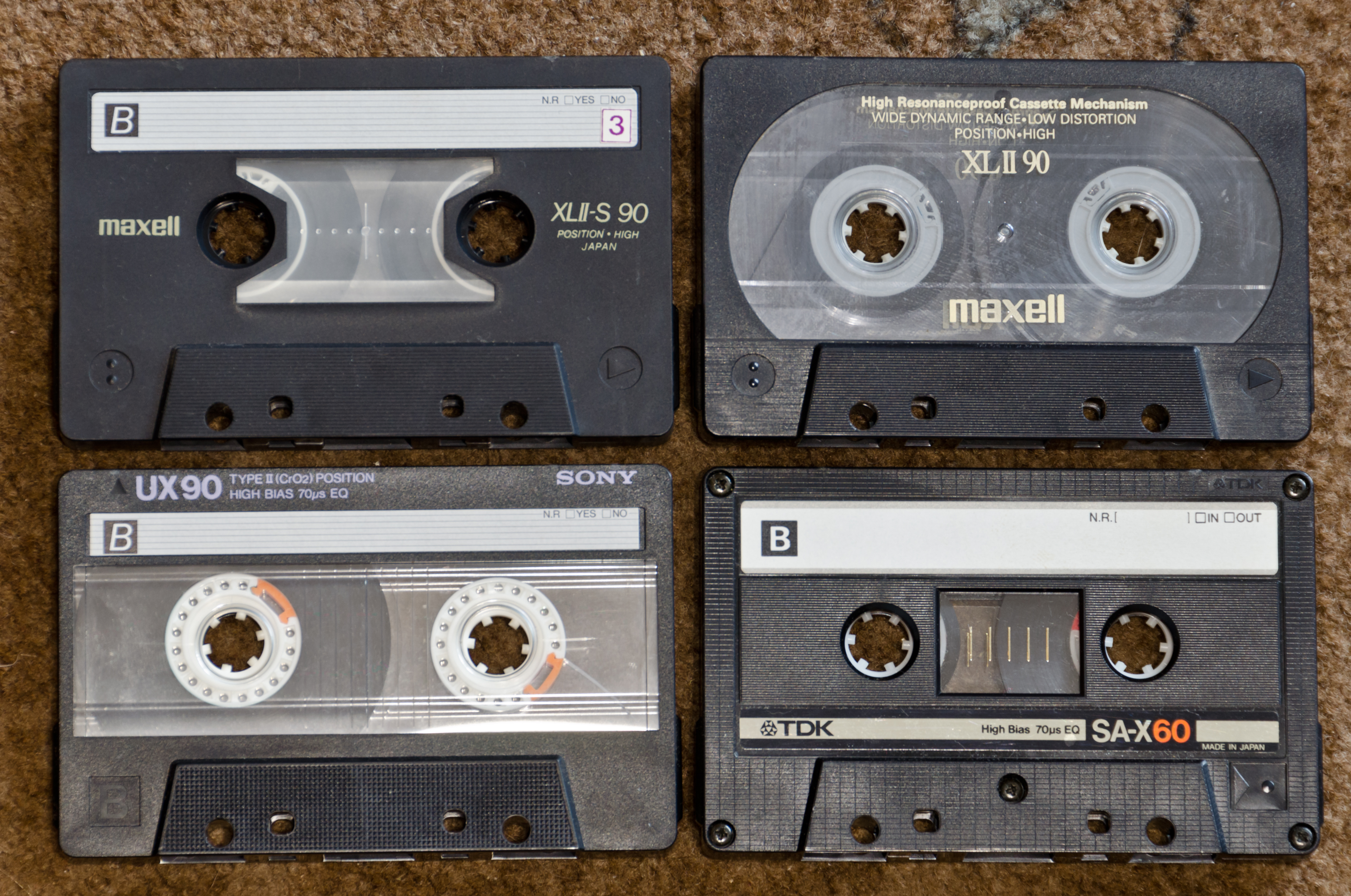
A collection of blank cassettes from major manufacturers; Late 1980s designs

Despite sales of CDs overtaking those of pre-recorded cassettes in the early 1990s in the U.S., the format remained popular for specific applications, such as car audio, personal stereos, boomboxes, telephone answering machines, dictation, field recording, home recording, and mixtapes well into the decade. Cassette players were typically more resistant to shocks than CD players, and their lower fidelity was not considered a serious drawback in mobile use. With the introduction of electronic skip protection it became possible to use portable CD players on the go, and automotive CD players became viable. CD-R drives and media also became affordable for consumers around the same time.

By 1993, annual shipments of CD players had reached 5 million, up 21% from the year before; while cassette player shipments had dropped 7% to approximately 3.4 million. Sales of pre-recorded music cassettes in the US dropped from 442 million in 1990 to 274,000 by 2007. For audiobooks, the final year that cassettes represented more than 50% of total market sales was 2002 when they were replaced by CDs as the dominant media.

The last new car with an available cassette player was a 2014 TagAZ AQUiLA. Four years prior, Sony had stopped the production of personal cassette players. In 2011, the Oxford English Dictionary removed the phrase "cassette player" from its 12th edition Concise version, which prompted some media sources to mistakenly report that the term "cassette tape" was being removed.

In India, music continued to be released on the cassette format due to its low cost until 2009.

=== 21st century ===
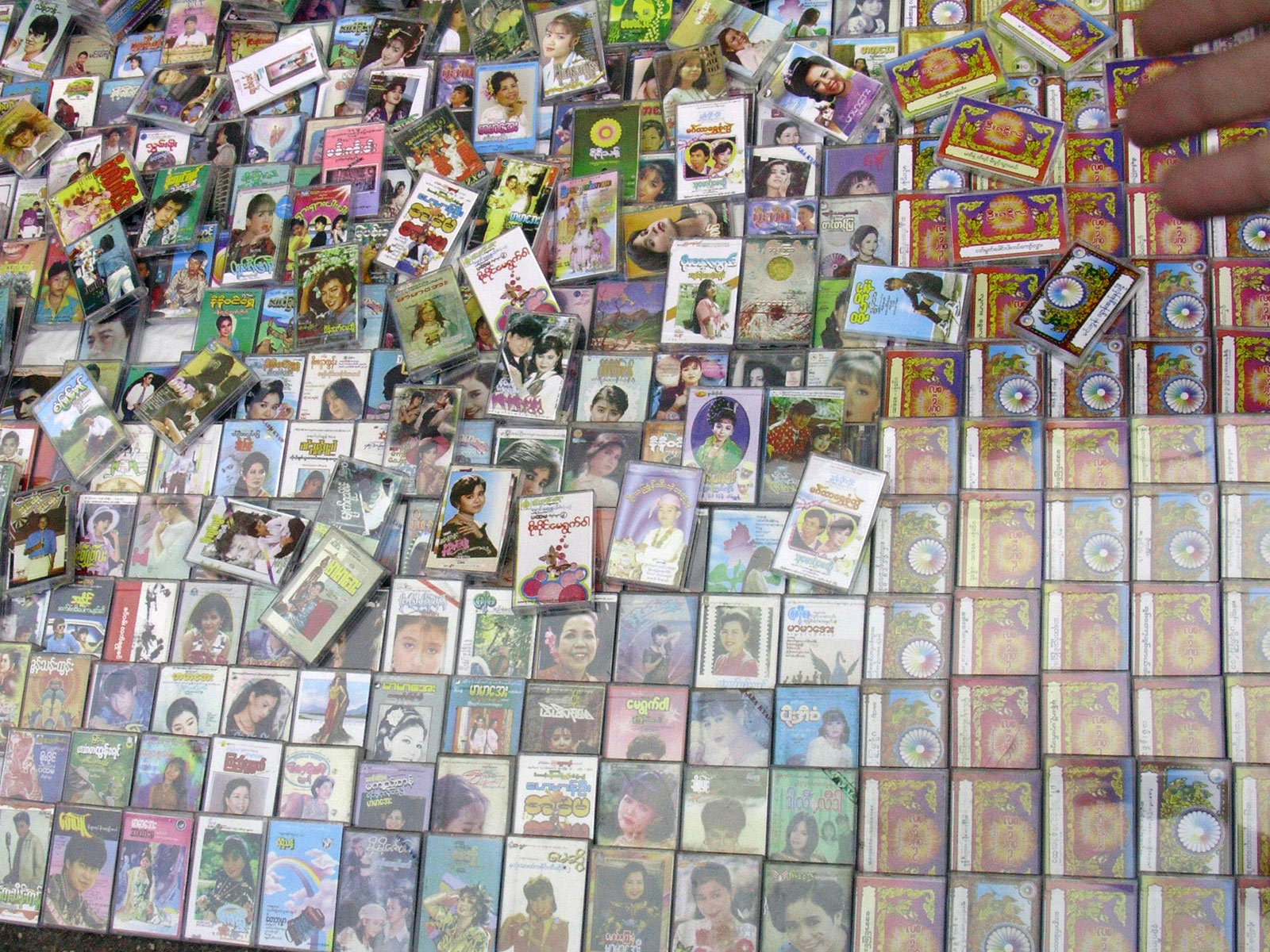
Burmese music cassette tapes for sale, Yangon, Myanmar (2006)

Although portable digital recorders are most common today, analog tape remains a desirable option for certain artists and consumers. Underground and DIY communities release regularly, and sometimes exclusively, on cassette format, particularly in experimental music circles and to a lesser extent in hardcore punk, death metal, and black metal circles, out of a fondness for the format. Even among major-label stars, the form has at least one devotee: Thurston Moore stated in 2009, "I only listen to cassettes". By 2019, few companies still made cassettes. Among those are National Audio Company, from the US, and Mulann, also known as Recording The Masters, from France.

Sony announced the end of cassette Walkman production on 22 October 2010, a result of the emergence of MP3 players such as Apple's iPod. As of 2022, Sony uses the Walkman brand solely for its line of digital media players.

The 2010 Lexus SC430 was the last automobile sold new in North America with a compact cassette player as standard equipment.

In 2010, Botswana-based Diamond Studios announced plans for establishing a plant to mass-produce cassettes in a bid to combat piracy. It opened in 2011.

In South Korea, the early English education boom for toddlers encourages a continuous demand for English language cassettes, as of 2011, due to the affordable cost.

National Audio Company in Missouri, the largest of the few remaining manufacturers of audio cassettes in the US, oversaw the mass production of the "Awesome Mix #1" cassette from the film Guardians of the Galaxy in 2014. They reported that they had produced more than 10 million tapes in 2014 and that sales were up 20 percent the following year, their best year since they opened in 1969. In 2016, cassette sales in the United States rose by 74% to 129,000. In 2018, following several years of shortage, National Audio Company began producing their own magnetic tape, becoming the world's first known manufacturer of an all-new tape stock. Mulann, a company which acquired Pyral/RMGI in 2015 and originates from BASF, also started production of its new cassette tape stock in 2018, basing on reel tape formula.

In Japan and South Korea, the pop acts Seiko Matsuda, SHINee, and NCT 127 released their material on limited-run cassettes. In Reiwa era Japan, the revived popularity of cassette tapes is an example of Showa retro. As of 2021, Maxell was selling 8 million cassette tapes per year in Japan.

In the mid-to-late 2010s, cassette sales saw a modest resurgence concurrent with the vinyl revival. As early as 2015, the retail chain Urban Outfitters, which had long sold LPs, started selling new pre-recorded cassettes (both new and old albums), blank cassettes, and players. In 2016, cassette sales increased, a trend that continued in 2017 and 2018. In the UK, sales of cassette tapes in 2021 reached its highest number since 2003.

Cassettes are favored by some artists and listeners, including those of older genres of music such as dansband, as well as independent and underground artists, some of whom were releasing new music on tape by the 2020s, including Britney Spears and Busta Rhymes. Reasons cited for this include tradition, low cost, the DIY ease of use, and a nostalgic fondness for how the format's imperfections lend greater vibrancy to low-fi, experimental music, despite the lack of the "full-bodied richness" of vinyl.

== Tape types ==
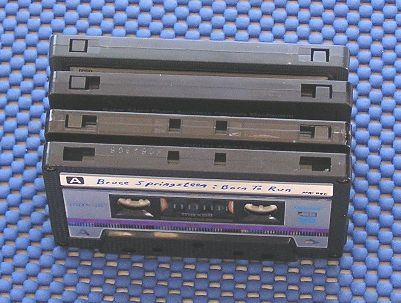
Notches on the top surface of the Compact Cassette indicate its type. The rear-most cassette at the top of this picture, with only write-protect notches (here covered by write-protect tabs), is Type I, its tape consisting of iron oxide. The next cassette down, with additional notches adjacent to the write-protect tabs, is Type II, its tape consisting of chrome and cobalt. The bottom two cassettes, featuring the Type II notches plus an additional pair in the center of the cassette, are Type IV (metal); note the removal of the tabs on the second of these, meaning the tape is write-protected. Type III was a combination of Types I and II but never gained the popularity of the other three types and was made obsolete by Type IV.

Cassette tapes are made of a polyester-type plastic film with a magnetic coating. The original magnetic material was based on gamma ferric oxide (Fe_{2}O_{3}), using a formulation developed by BASF. c. 1970, 3M Company developed a cobalt volume-doping process combined with a double-coating technique to enhance overall tape output levels. This product was marketed as "High Energy" under its Scotch brand of recording tapes. Inexpensive cassettes commonly are labeled "low-noise", but typically are not optimized for high frequency response. For this reason, some low-grade IEC Type I tapes have been marketed specifically as better suited for data storage than for sound recording.

In 1968, DuPont, the inventor of a chromium dioxide (CrO_{2}) manufacturing process, began commercialization of CrO_{2} media. The first CrO_{2} cassette was introduced in 1970 by Advent, and later strongly backed by BASF, the inventor and long-time manufacturer of magnetic recording tape. Next, coatings using magnetite (Fe_{3}O_{4}) such as TDK's Audua were produced in an attempt to approach or exceed the sound quality of vinyl records. Cobalt-adsorbed iron oxide (Avilyn) was introduced by TDK in 1974 and proved very successful. "Type IV" tapes using pure metal particles (as opposed to oxide formulations) were introduced in 1979 by 3M under the trade name Metafine. The tape coating on most cassettes sold as of 2024 are either "normal" or "chrome" consists of ferric oxide and cobalt mixed in varying ratios (and using various processes); there are very few cassettes on the market that use a pure (CrO_{2}) coating.

Simple voice recorders and earlier cassette decks are designed to work with standard ferric formulations. Newer tape decks usually are built with switches and later detectors for the different bias and equalization requirements for higher grade tapes. The most common are iron oxide tapes (as defined by the IEC 60094 standard).

Notches on top of the cassette shell indicate the type of tape. Type I cassettes have only write-protect notches, Type II has an additional pair next to the write protection ones, and Type IV (metal) have a third set near the middle of the top of the cassette shell. These allow later cassette decks to detect the tape type automatically and select the proper bias and equalization.

== Features ==
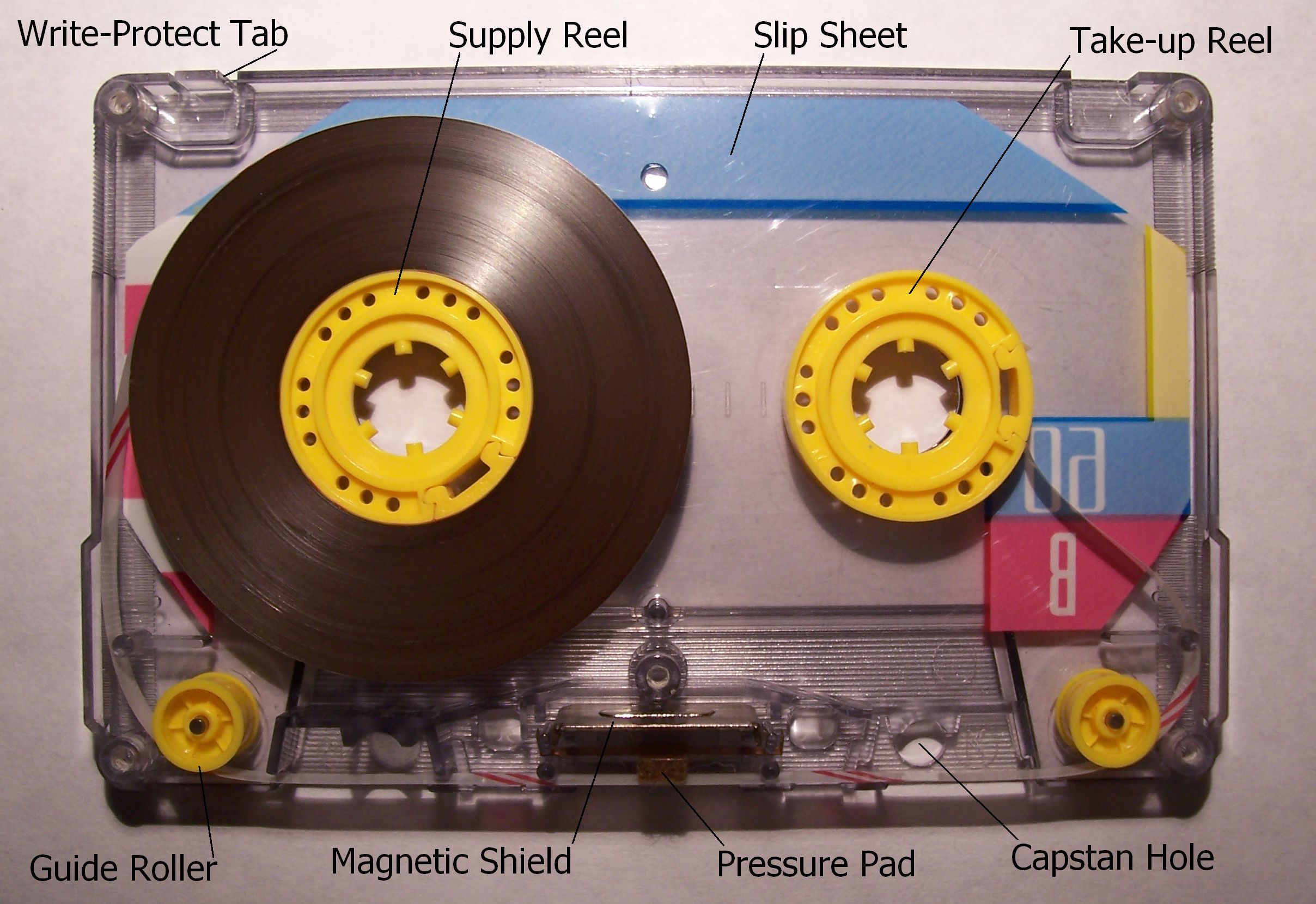
Inside of a Compact Cassette with labels of its parts

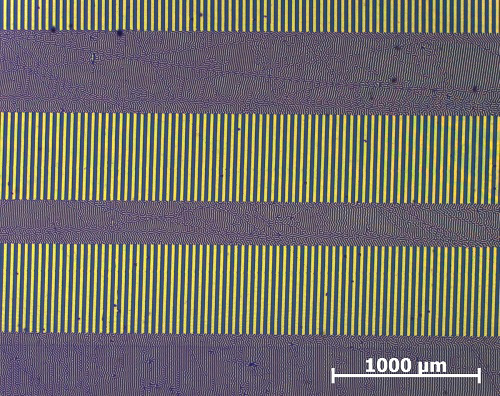
Visualization of the magnetic field on a stereo cassette containing a 1 kHz audio tone

The cassette was the next step following reel-to-reel audio tape recording, although, because of the limitations of the cassette's size and speed, it initially compared poorly in quality. Unlike the four-track stereo open-reel format, the two stereo tracks of each side lie adjacent to each other, rather than being interleaved with the tracks of the other side. This permitted monaural cassette players to play stereo recordings "summed" as mono tracks and permitted stereo players to play mono recordings through both speakers. The tape is 3.81 mm (0.15 in) wide, with each mono track 1.5 mm (0.059 in) wide, plus an unrecorded guard band between each track. In stereo, each track is further divided into a left and a right channel of 0.6 mm (0.024 in) each, with a gap of 0.3 mm (0.012 in). The tape moves past the playback head at 47.625 mm/s (1.875 in/s), the speed being a continuation of the increasingly slower speed series in open-reel machines operating at 762 mm/s (30 in/s), 381 mm/s (15 in/s), 190.5 mm/s (7.5 in/s) or 95.25 mm/s (3.75 in/s). For comparison, the typical open-reel 6.35 mm (0.25 in) 4-track consumer format used tape that is 6.3 mm (0.248 in) wide, each track 1.1 mm (0.043 in) wide, and running at either twice or four times the speed of a cassette.

Very simple cassette recorders for dictation purposes did not tightly control tape speed and relied on playback on a similar device to maintain intelligible recordings. For accurate reproduction of music, a tape transport incorporating a capstan and pinch roller system was used, to ensure tape passed over the record/playback heads at a constant speed.

=== Locating write-protect notches ===
If the cassette is held with one of the labels facing the user and the tape opening at the bottom, the write-protect notch for the corresponding side is at the top-left.

=== Tape length ===
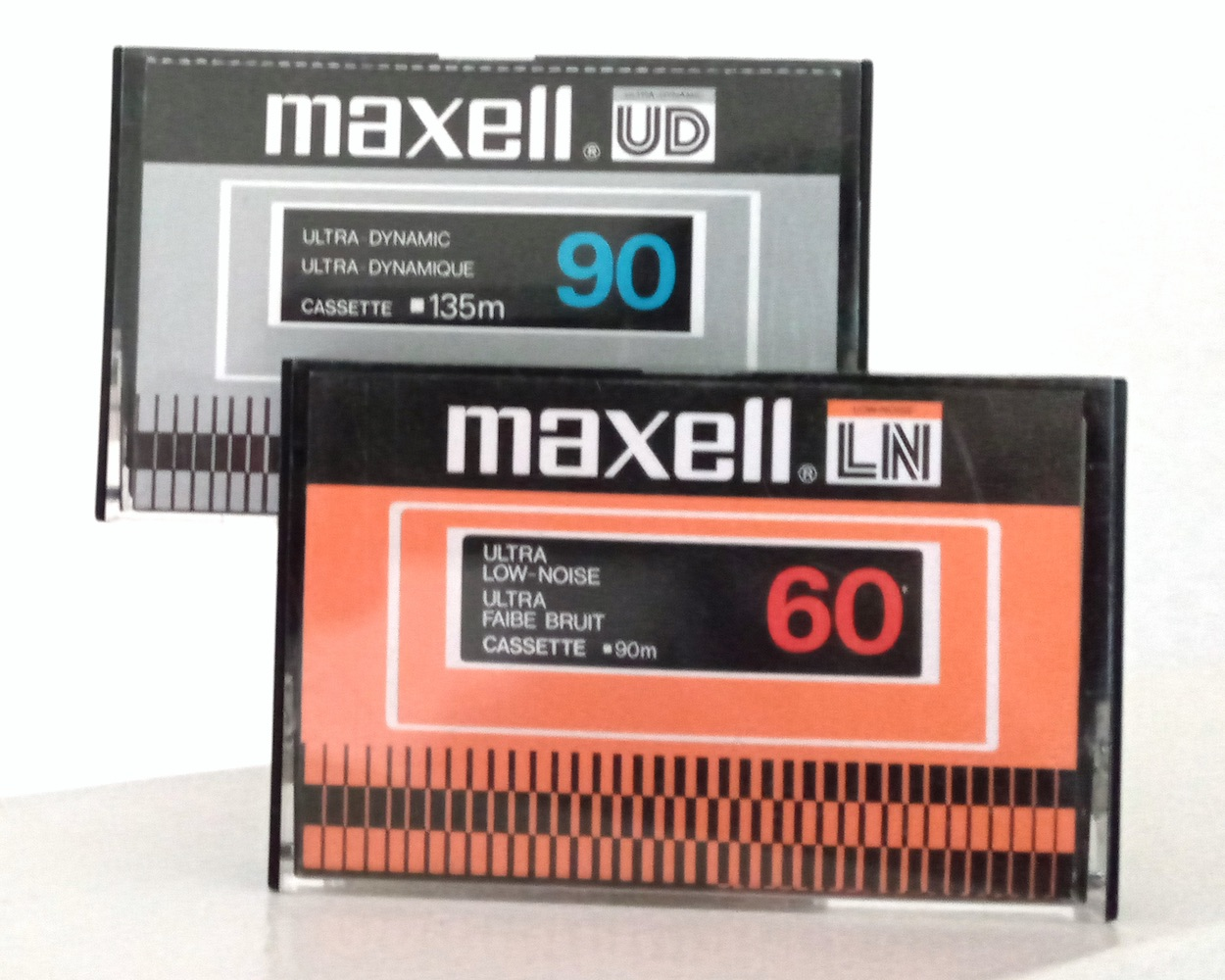
Maxell compact cassettes, C60 (90 m) and C90 (135 m)

Tape length usually is measured in minutes of total playing time. Many of the varieties of blank tape were C60 (30 minutes per side), C90 (45 minutes per side) and C120 (60 minutes per side). Maxell makes 150-minute cassettes (UR-150) - 75 minutes per side. The C46 and C60 lengths typically are 15 to 16 μm (0.59 to 0.63 mils) thick, but C90s are 10 to 11 μm (0.39 to 0.43 mils) and (the less common) C120s are just 6 μm (0.24 mils) thick, rendering them more susceptible to stretching or breakage. Even C180 tapes were available at one point.

Other lengths are (or were) also available from some vendors, including C10, C12 and C15 (useful for saving data from early home computers and in telephone answering machines), C30, C40, C50, C54, C64, C70, C74, C80, C84, C94, C100, C105, C110, and C150. As late as 2010, Thomann still offered C10, C20, C30 and C40 IEC Type II tape cassettes for use with 4- and 8-track portastudios.

=== Track width ===
The full tape width is 3.8 mm (0.15 in). For mono recording the track width is 1.5 mm (0.059 in). In stereo mode each channel has width of 0.6 mm (0.0236 in) 0.6 mm with a 0.3 mm (0.0118 in) separation to avoid crosstalk.

=== Head gap ===
The head-gap width is 2 μm which gives a theoretical maximum frequency of about 12 kHz (at the standard speed of 47.625 mm/s (1.875 in/s). A narrower gap would give a higher frequency limit but also weaker magnetization.

=== Cassette tape adapter ===
Cassette tape adapters allow external audio sources to be played back from any tape player, but were typically used for car audio systems. An attached audio cable with a phone connector converts the electrical signals to be read by the tape head, while mechanical gears simulate reel to reel movement without actual tapes when driven by the player mechanism. There are also other type of cassette adapters, like Bluetooth Adapter Cassette or MP3 player cassette. They have a small battery inside and can be used by simply inserting them in a cassette player. Most of them also turn on when the cassette player is set on Play, by a small switch under the head in the cassette adapter. Most have a reel to reel gear for simulating the move of tape, otherwise, the player will either stop or reverse. Most adapters operate one side, although some may operate on both sides.

=== Optional mechanical elements ===
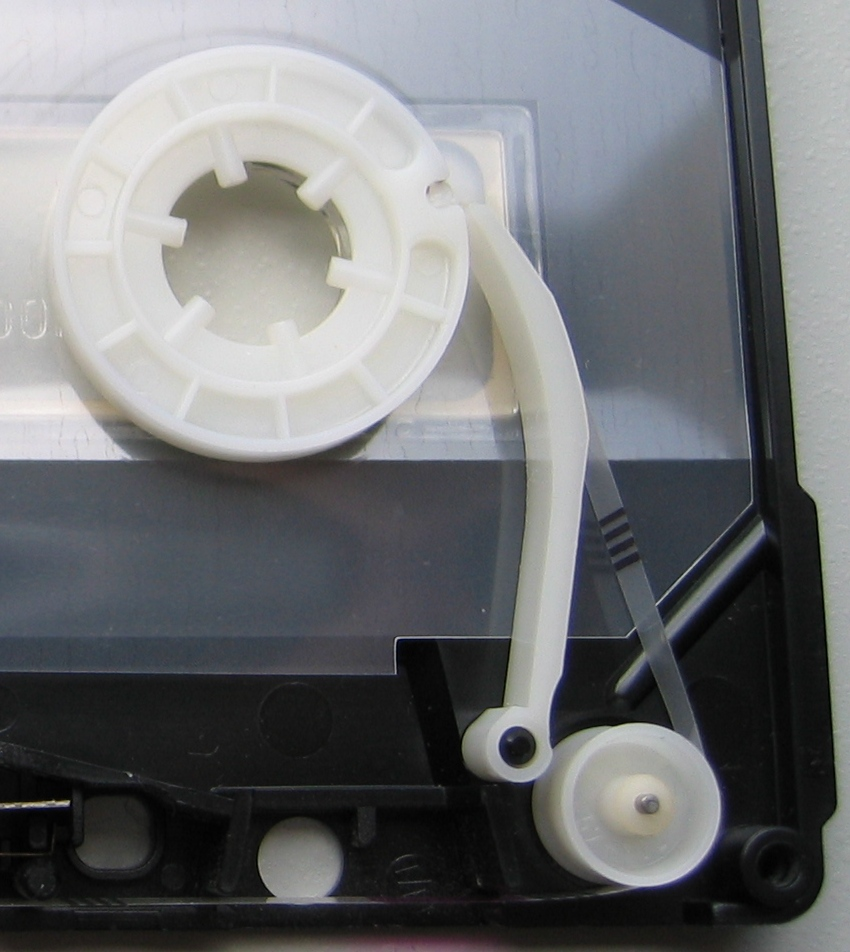
Tape Guide via Security Mechanism (SM)

In order to wind up the tape more reliably, the former BASF (from 1998 EMTEC) patented the Special Mechanism or Security Mechanism advertised with the abbreviation SM in the early 1970s, which was temporarily used under license by Agfa. This feature each includes a rail to guide the tape to the spool and prevent an uneven roll from forming.

=== Flaws ===
Magnetic tape is not an ideal medium for long-term archival storage, as it begins to degrade after 10 – 20 years.

A common mechanical problem occurs when a defective player or resistance in the tape path causes insufficient tension on the take-up spool. This would cause the magnetic tape to be fed out through the bottom of the cassette and become tangled in the mechanism of the player. In these cases, the player was said to have "eaten" or "chewed" the tape, often destroying the playability of the cassette.

== Cassette recorders ==
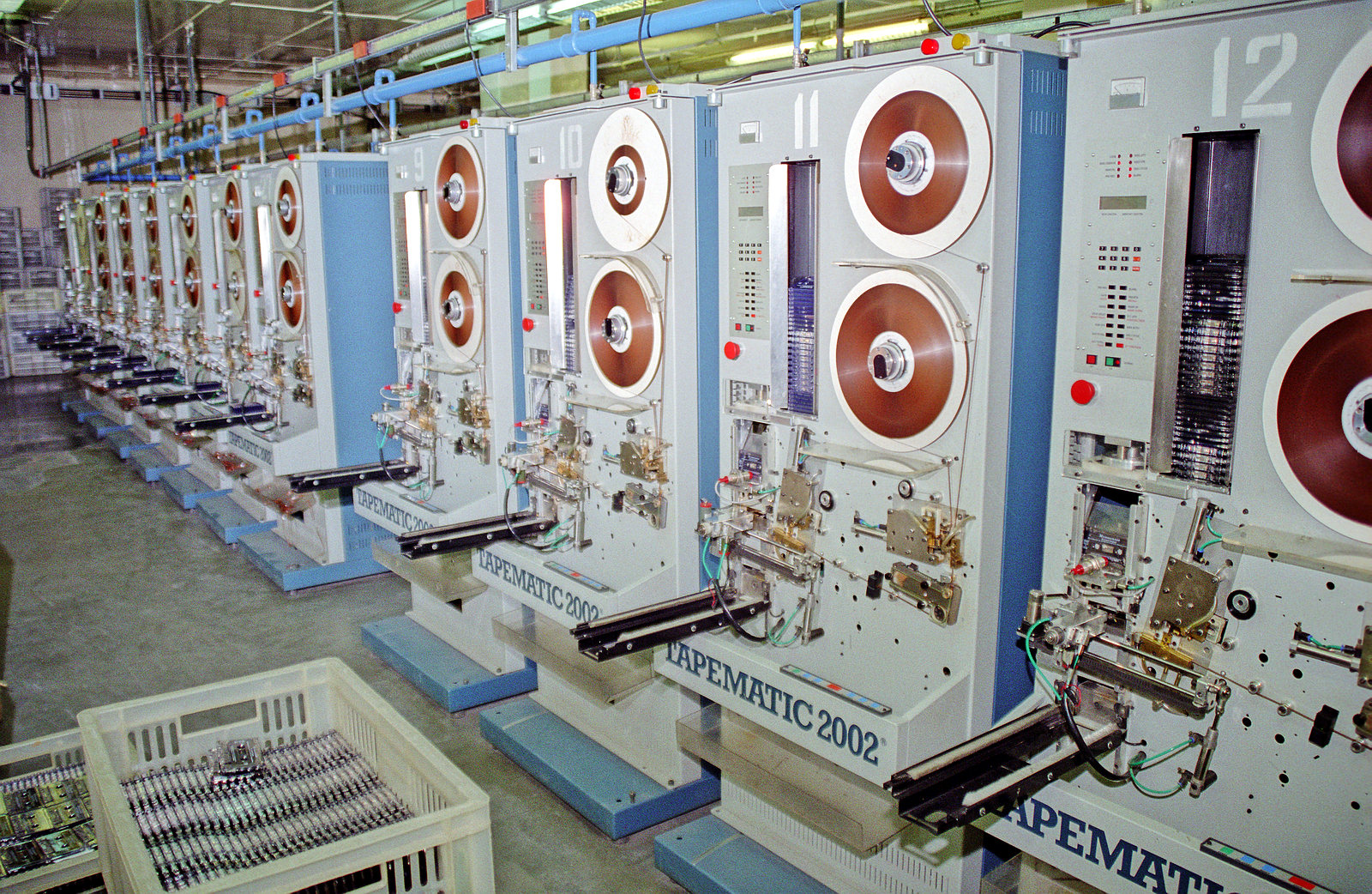
Tapematic 2002 audio cassette loaders, used to wind (load) magnetic tape from tape reels (pancakes) in the machine into empty cassette tape shells (known as C-0s or C-Zeros). The C-0s have just leader which is cut into two and the tape is attached to the leader, then wound.

The first cassette machines (e.g. the Philips EL 3300), were introduced in August 1963.

One innovation was the front-loading arrangement. Pioneer's angled cassette bay and the exposed bays of some Sansui models eventually were standardized as a front-loading door into which a cassette would be loaded. Later models would adopt electronic buttons, and replace conventional meters (which could be driven over full scale when overloaded, a condition called "pegging the needle" or simply "pegging") with electronic LED or vacuum fluorescent displays, with level controls typically being controlled by either rotary controls or side-by-side sliders.

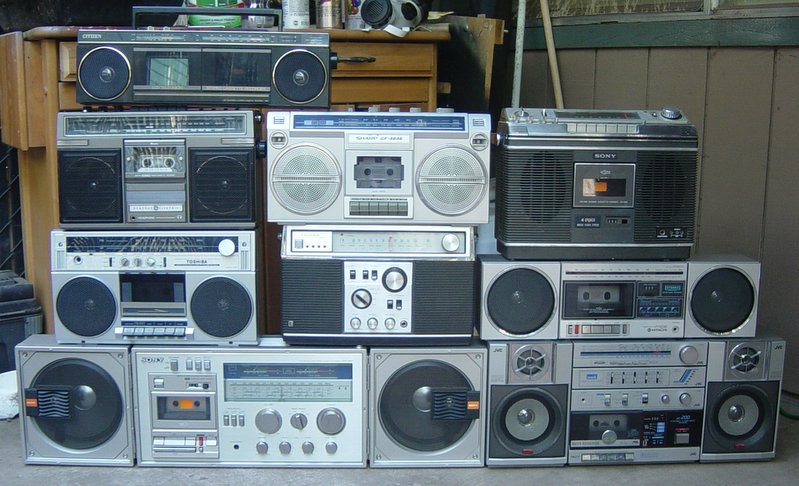
Radio–cassette players of the design also called ghetto-blasters and boomboxes

Applications for car stereos varied widely. Auto manufacturers in the US typically would fit a cassette slot into their standard large radio faceplates. Europe and Asia would standardize on DIN and double DIN sized faceplates. In the 1980s, a high-end installation would have a Dolby AM/FM cassette deck, and they rendered the 8-track player obsolete in car installations because of space, performance, and audio quality. In the 1990s and 2000s, as the cost of building CD players declined, many manufacturers offered a CD player. The CD player eventually supplanted the cassette deck as standard equipment, but some cars, especially those targeted at older drivers, were offered with the option of a cassette player, either by itself or sometimes in combination with a CD slot. Most new cars can still accommodate aftermarket cassette players, and the auxiliary jack advertised for MP3 players can be used also with portable cassette players, but 2011 was the first model year for which no American manufacturer offered factory-installed cassette players.

== Applications ==
=== Audio ===
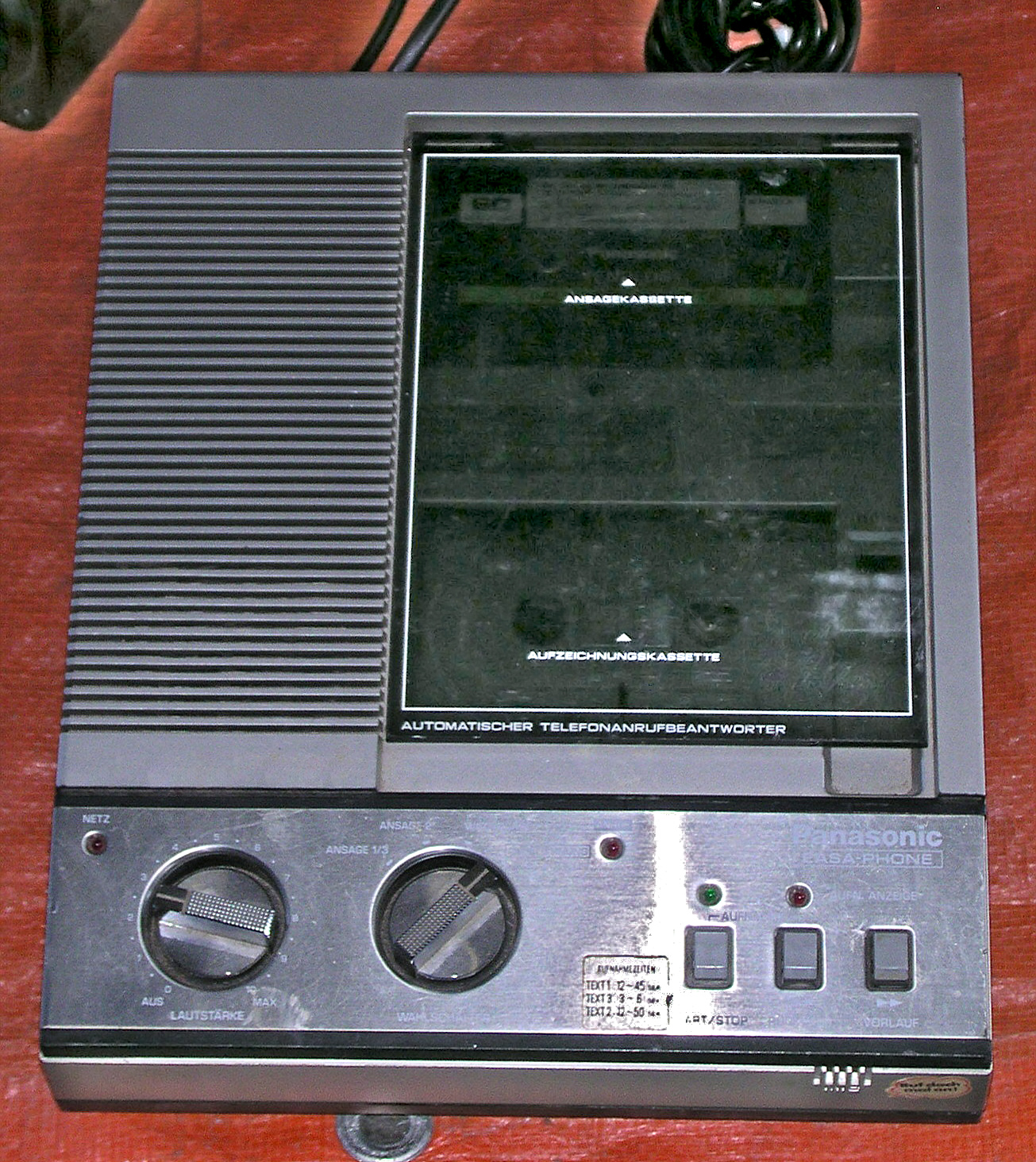
A dual cassette-based Panasonic answering machine

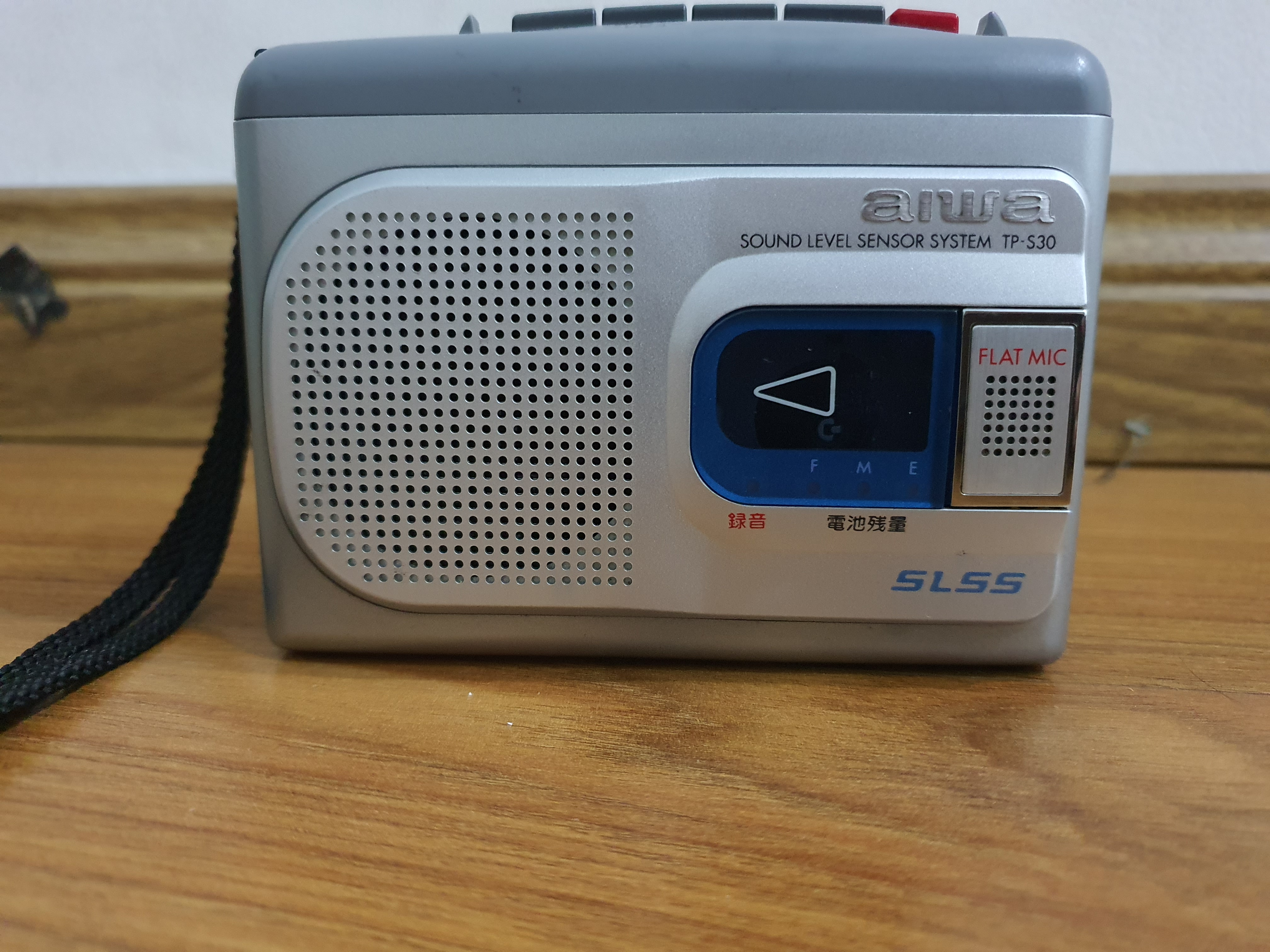
An early-2000s portable cassette recorder designed for basic dictation and voice recording

The Compact Cassette originally was intended for use in dictation machines. In this capacity, some later-model cassette-based dictation machines could also run the tape at half speed 23.8 mm/s (0.94 in/s) as playback quality was not critical. The cassette soon became a medium for distributing prerecorded music—initially through the Philips Record Company (and subsidiary labels Mercury and Philips in the US). As of 2009, one still found cassettes used for a variety of purposes, such as journalism, oral history, meeting and interview transcripts, audio books, and so on. Police are still big buyers of cassette tapes, as some lawyers "don't trust digital technology for interviews". However, they are starting to give way to Compact Discs and more "compact" digital storage media. Prerecorded cassettes were also employed as a way to provide chemotherapy information to recently diagnosed cancer patients as studies found anxiety and fear often interferes with information processing.

The cassette quickly found use in the commercial music industry. One artifact found on some commercially produced music cassettes was a sequence of test tones, called SDR (Super Dynamic Range, also called XDR, or eXtended Dynamic Range) soundburst tones, at the beginning and end of the tape, heard in order of low frequency to high. These were used during SDR/XDR's duplication process to gauge the quality of the tape medium. Many consumers objected to these tones since they were not part of the recorded music.

Leveraging high-speed duplication machines manufactured by companies such as Telex, Otari, and Sony, cassettes were widely used by the Christian faith community for sermon duplication during the 1970s-1990s. One ministry claims a quantity and distribution of "almost 9 million cassettes in 42 languages". Duplication was obsoleted during the 1980s-1990s when Compact Disc duplication and compressed digital audio files were popularized.

=== Multitrack recording ===
Multitrack recorders utilizing the compact cassette were introduced beginning in 1979 with the TEAC 144 Portastudio. In the simplest configuration, rather than playing a pair of stereo channels of each side of the cassette, the typical portastudio used a four-track tape head assembly to access four tracks on the cassette at once (with the tape playing in one direction). Each track could be recorded to, erased, or played back individually, allowing musicians to overdub themselves and create simple multitrack recordings easily, which could then be mixed down to a finished stereo version on an external machine. To increase audio quality in these recorders, the tape speed sometimes was doubled to 95.25 mm/s (3.75 in/s), in comparison to the standard 47.625 mm/s (1.875 in/s); additionally, dbx, Dolby B or Dolby C noise reduction provided compansion (compression of the signal during recording with equal and opposite expansion of the signal during playback), which yields increased dynamic range by lowering the noise level and increasing the maximum signal level before distortion occurs. Multi-track cassette recorders with built-in mixer and signal routing features ranged from easy-to-use beginner units up to professional-level recording systems. Cassette-based multitrack recorders are credited with launching the home recording revolution.

=== Home dubbing ===
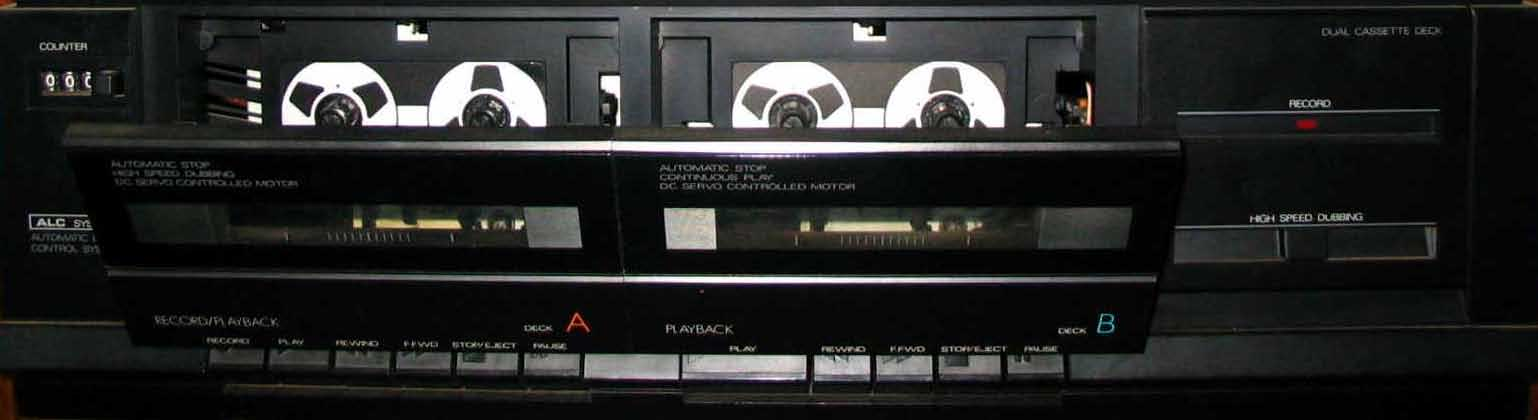
A Magnavox dual deck recorder with high-speed dubbing. Doors are open showing the winding mecanisms.

Most cassettes were sold blank, and used for recording (dubbing) the owner's records (as backup, to play in the car, or to make mixtape compilations), their friends' records, or music from the radio. This practice was condemned by the music industry with such alarmist slogans as "Home Taping Is Killing Music". However, many claimed that the medium was ideal for spreading new music and would increase sales, and strongly defended their right to copy at least their own records onto tape. For a limited time in the early 1980s Island Records sold chromium dioxide "One Plus One"

Various legal cases arose surrounding the dubbing of cassettes. In the UK, in the case of CBS Songs v. Amstrad (1988), the House of Lords found in favor of Amstrad that producing equipment that facilitated the dubbing of cassettes, in this case a high-speed twin cassette deck that allowed one cassette to be copied directly onto another, did not constitute copyright infringement by the manufacturer. In a similar case, a shop owner who rented cassettes and sold blank tapes was not liable for copyright infringement even though it was clear that his customers likely were dubbing them at home. In both cases, the courts held that manufacturers and retailers could not be held accountable for the actions of consumers.

As an alternative to home dubbing, in the late 1980s, the Personics company installed booths in record stores across America that allowed customers to make personalized mixtapes from a digitally encoded back-catalogue with customised printed covers.

=== Data recording ===
Apple BASIC cassette tape
When played back as audio, computer data tapes will make erratic noises.

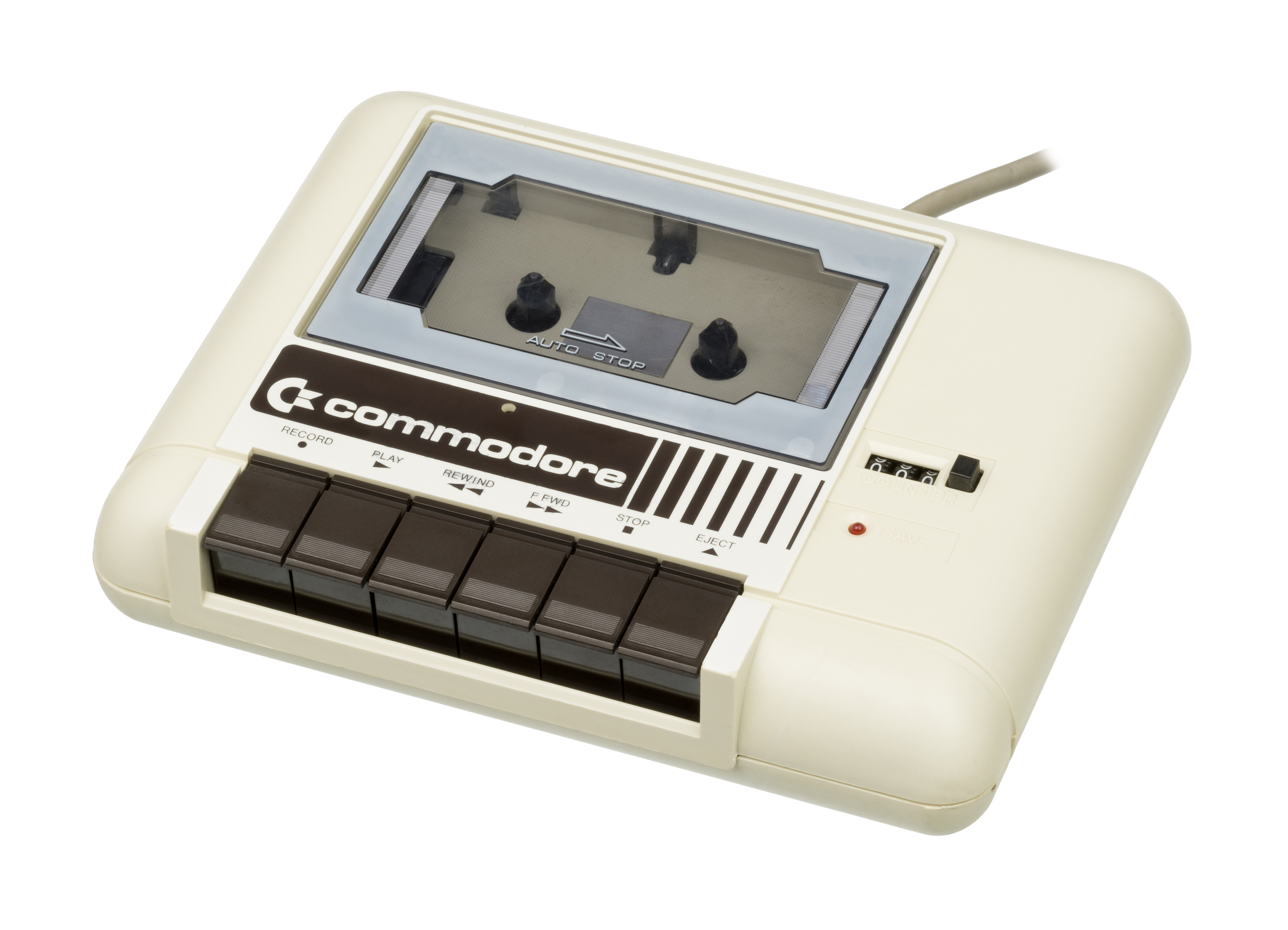
A C2N Datassette recorder for Commodore computers

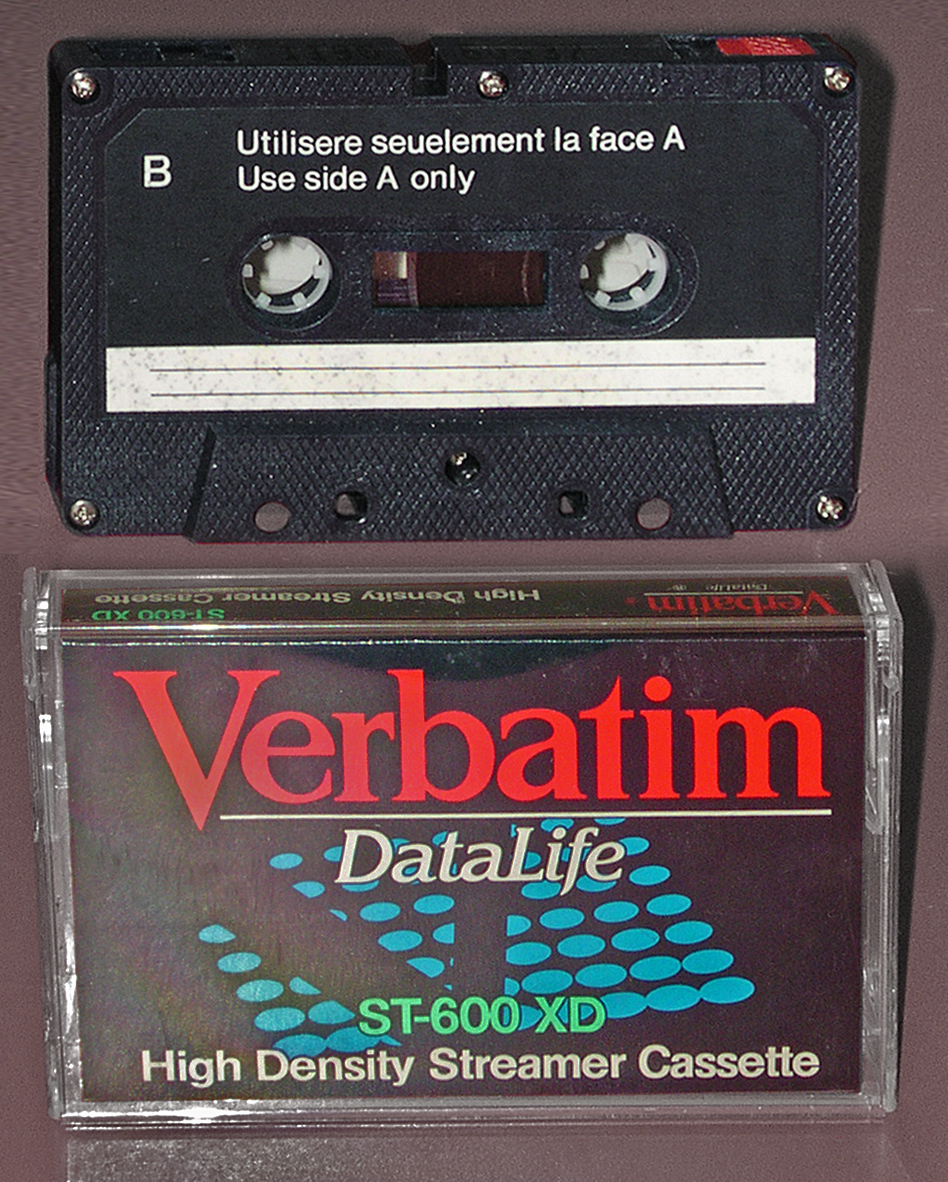
A streamer cassette for data storage, adapted from the audio Compact Cassette format

Floppy disk storage had become the standard data storage medium in the United States by the mid-1980s; for example, by 1983 the majority of software sold by Atari Program Exchange was on floppy. Cassette remained more popular for 8-bit computers such as the Commodore 64, ZX Spectrum, MSX, and Amstrad CPC 464 in many countries such as the United Kingdom (where 8-bit software was mostly sold on cassette until that market disappeared altogether in the early 1990s). Reliability of cassettes for data storage is inconsistent, with many users recalling repeated attempts to load video games; the Commodore Datasette used very reliable, but slow, digital encoding. In some countries, including the United Kingdom, Poland, Hungary, and the Netherlands, cassette data storage was so popular that some radio stations would broadcast computer programs that listeners could record onto cassette and then load into their computer. See BASICODE.

The cassette was adapted into what is called a streamer cassette (also known as a "D/CAS" cassette), a version dedicated solely for data storage, and used chiefly for hard disk backups and other types of data. Streamer cassettes differed from standard Compact Cassettes not only in their formatting but also in the way the full tape width was used for recording data rather than separate audio tracks, allowing substantially greater storage density for backup applications. Streamer cassettes look almost exactly the same as a standard cassette, with the exception of having a notch about one quarter-inch wide and deep situated slightly off-center at the top edge of the cassette. Streamer cassettes also have a re-usable write-protect tab on only one side of the top edge of the cassette, with the other side of the top edge having either only an open rectangular hole, or no hole at all. This is due to the entire one-eighth inch width of the tape loaded inside being used by a streamer cassette drive for the writing and reading of data, hence only one side of the cassette being used. Streamer cassettes can hold anywhere from 250 kilobytes to 600 megabytes of data.

== Rivals and successors ==
Technical development of the cassette effectively ceased when digital recordable media, such as DAT and MiniDisc, were introduced in the late 1980s and early-to-mid 1990s, with Dolby S recorders marking the peak of Compact Cassette technology. Anticipating the switch from analog to digital format, major companies, such as Sony, shifted their focus to new media. DAT was accepted in professional usage because it could record without lossy compression effects. In 1992, Philips introduced the Digital Compact Cassette (DCC), a tape in almost the same shell as a Compact Cassette. It was aimed primarily at the consumer market. A DCC deck could play back both types of cassettes. DCC failed in home, mobile and professional environments, and was discontinued in 1996.

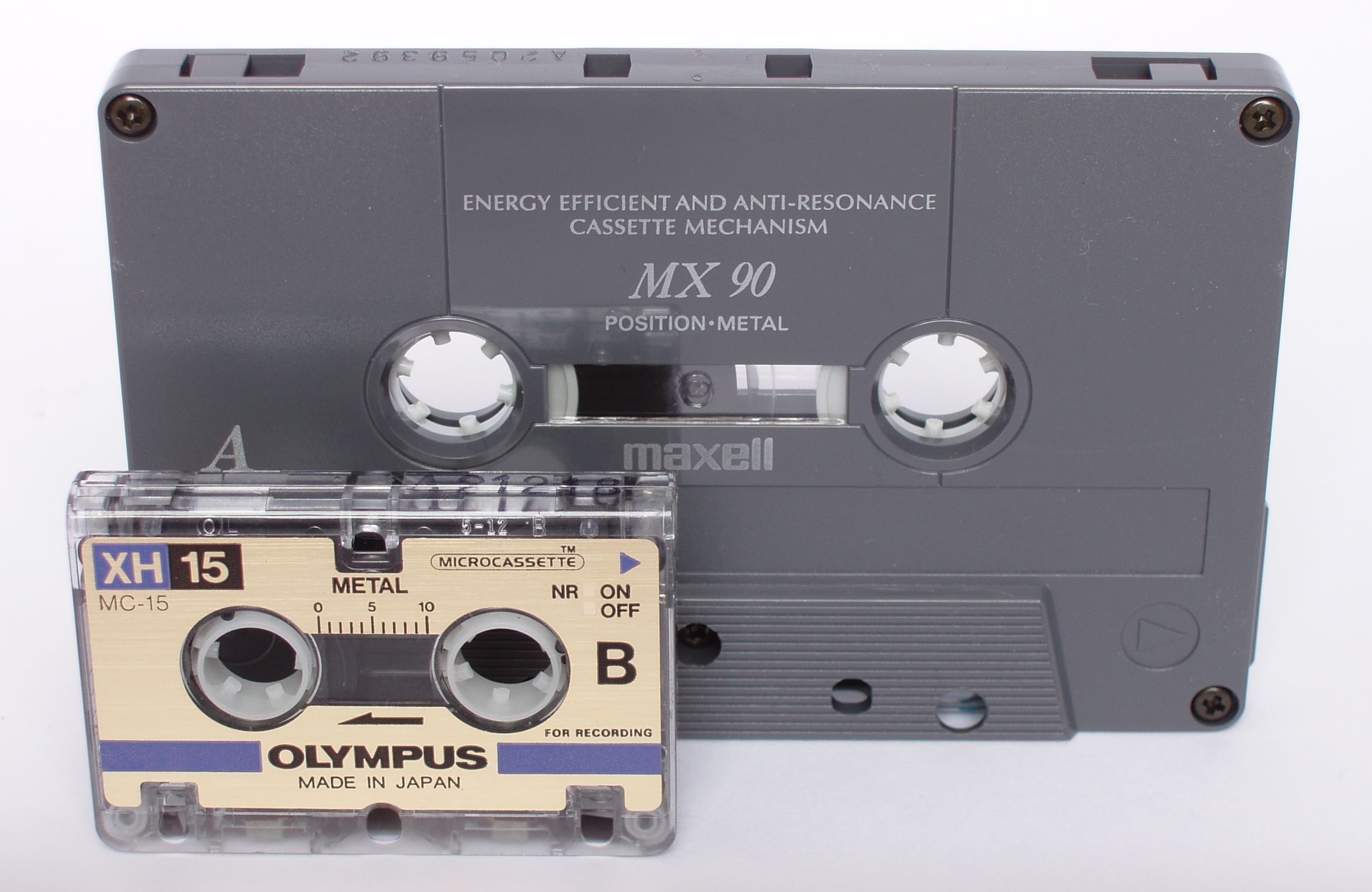
A Compact Cassette and a Microcassette

The microcassette largely supplanted the full-sized cassette in situations where voice-level fidelity is all that is required, such as in dictation machines and answering machines. Microcassettes have in turn given way to digital recorders of various descriptions. Since the rise of cheap CD-R discs, and flash memory-based digital audio players, the phenomenon of "home taping" has effectively switched to recording to a Compact Disc or downloading from commercial or music-sharing websites.

Because of consumer demand, the cassette has remained influential on design, more than a decade after its decline as a media mainstay. As the Compact Disc grew in popularity, cassette-shaped audio adapters were developed to provide an economical and clear way to obtain CD functionality in vehicles equipped with cassette decks but no CD player. A portable CD player would have its analog line-out connected to the adapter, which in turn fed the signal to the head of the cassette deck. These adapters continue to function with MP3 players and smartphones, and generally are more reliable than the FM transmitters that must be used to adapt CD players and digital audio players to car stereo systems. Digital audio players shaped as cassettes have also become available, which can be inserted into any cassette player and communicate with the head as if they were normal cassettes.

== See also ==
- Cassette (format)
- Compact Video Cassette
- Digital cassettes
- Digital journalism
- J-card
- Mini-Cassette
- Personal stereo
- Picocassette
- Pocket Rockers
- Timeline of audio formats
- VHS
- Video 2000
