= MPM Erelis =

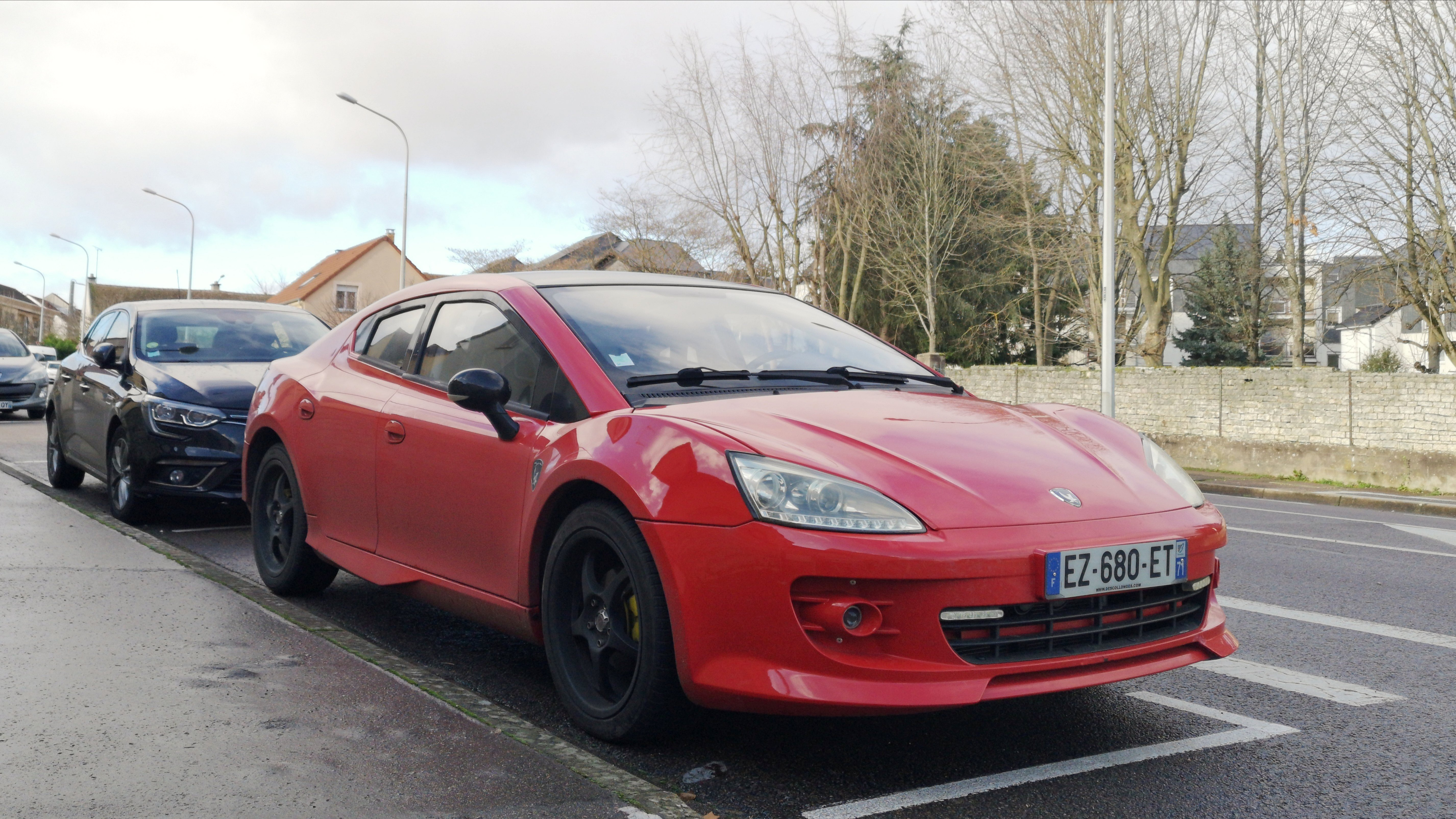

Overview
- Manufacturer: MPM Motors
- Production: 2016–2020
- Assembly: Trappes, Yvelines, France

Powertrain
- Engine: 1.2L 3-cyl
- Transmission: 6-speed manual

Dimensions
- Wheelbase: 104.3 in (2,649 mm)
- Curb weight: 1,225 kg (2,701 lb)

The Erelis (formerly the PS 160) was the first and only car produced by the defunct French car manufacturer MPM Motors from 2016. It is a modified Tagaz Aquila.

Originally named "PS160", MPM renamed its coupe "Erelis" in August 2018. The Erelis was designed as the first model of a range of vehicles developed by MPM Motors in order to offer a sports car at an affordable price. Erelis means eagle in Lithuanian.

The Erelis made its first public appearance at the Paris Motor Show 2018.

== Powertrain ==
During its development and for pre-series models, the MPM PS160 used a single gasoline engine, a 1.6 liter Mitsubishi Orion (4G18S) producing 75 kW (100 hp).

Then, following the signing of an agreement with PSA, it was replaced with 1.2-liter turbocharged PSA Group PureTech 3-cylinder engine producing 96 kW (129 hp) coupled to a 6-speed gearbox, passing under the bar of 150 g / km of CO_{2}. This change to the Peugeot-Citroën engine is accompanied by its name change.

	(pre-series) PS 160	(series) Erelis
Engine	inline 4 Mitsubishi 4G18S	inline 3 PSA EB2ADTS
Aspiration	Naturally aspirated	Turbocharged
Fuel	Petrol	
Cylinder capacity (cm³)	1,584	1,199
Max power	75 kW (100 hp)	96 kW (129 hp)
Max torque	138 N⋅m (102 lb⋅ft)	238 N⋅m (176 lb⋅ft)
at rpm	3,000	1,750
Gearbox	5 speed manual	6 speed manual
Top speed (km/h)	unknown	unknown
0–100 km/h (s)	n/a	n/a
Fuel consumption (L/100 km)	7,2	n/a
Emissions CO_{2} (g/km)	158	119
Tank capacity (L)	55	
Unloaded mass (EU)	1,225 kg (2,701 lb)	
Environmental Standard	Euro 6	Euro 6.2

=== Equipment ===
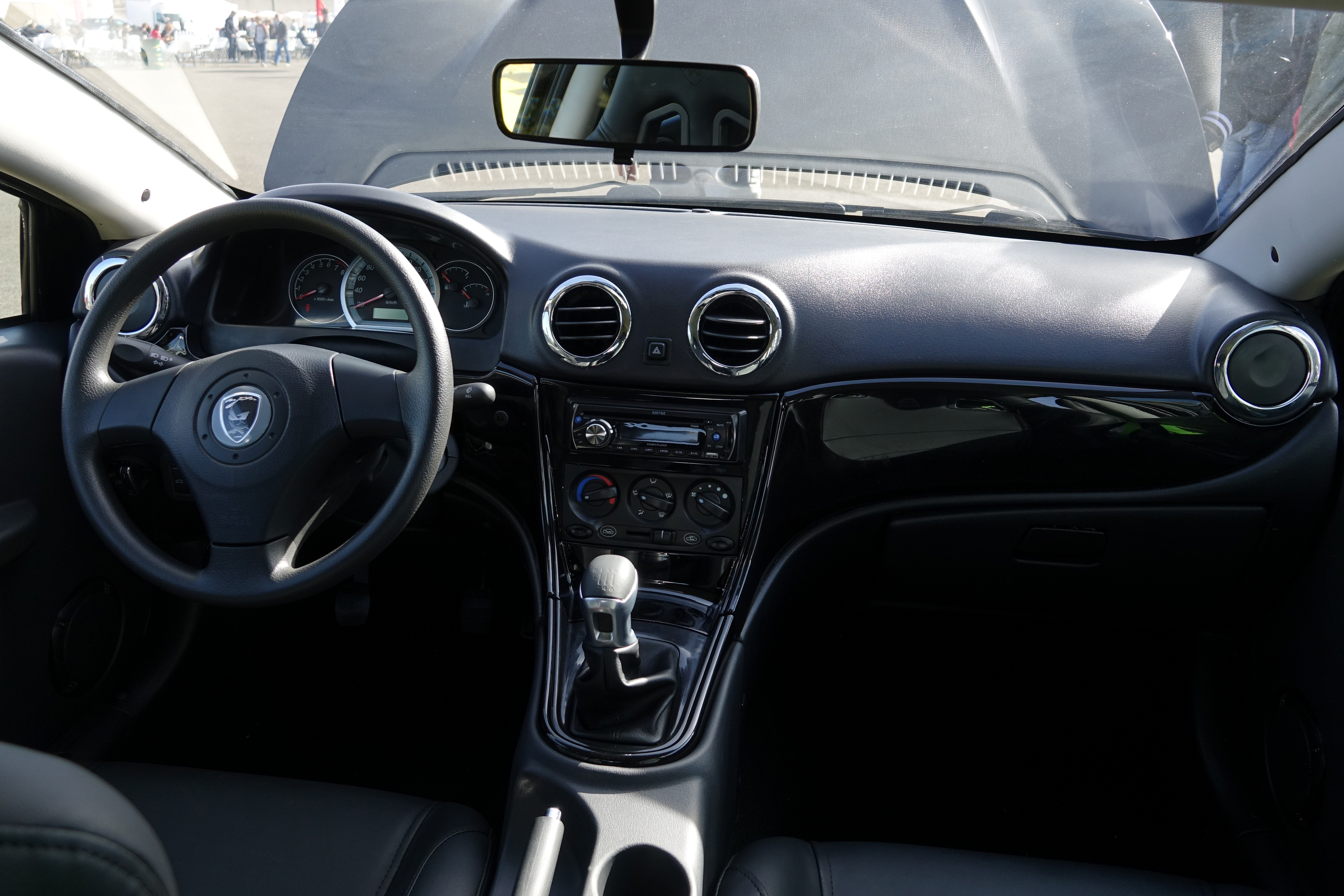
Erelis dashboard

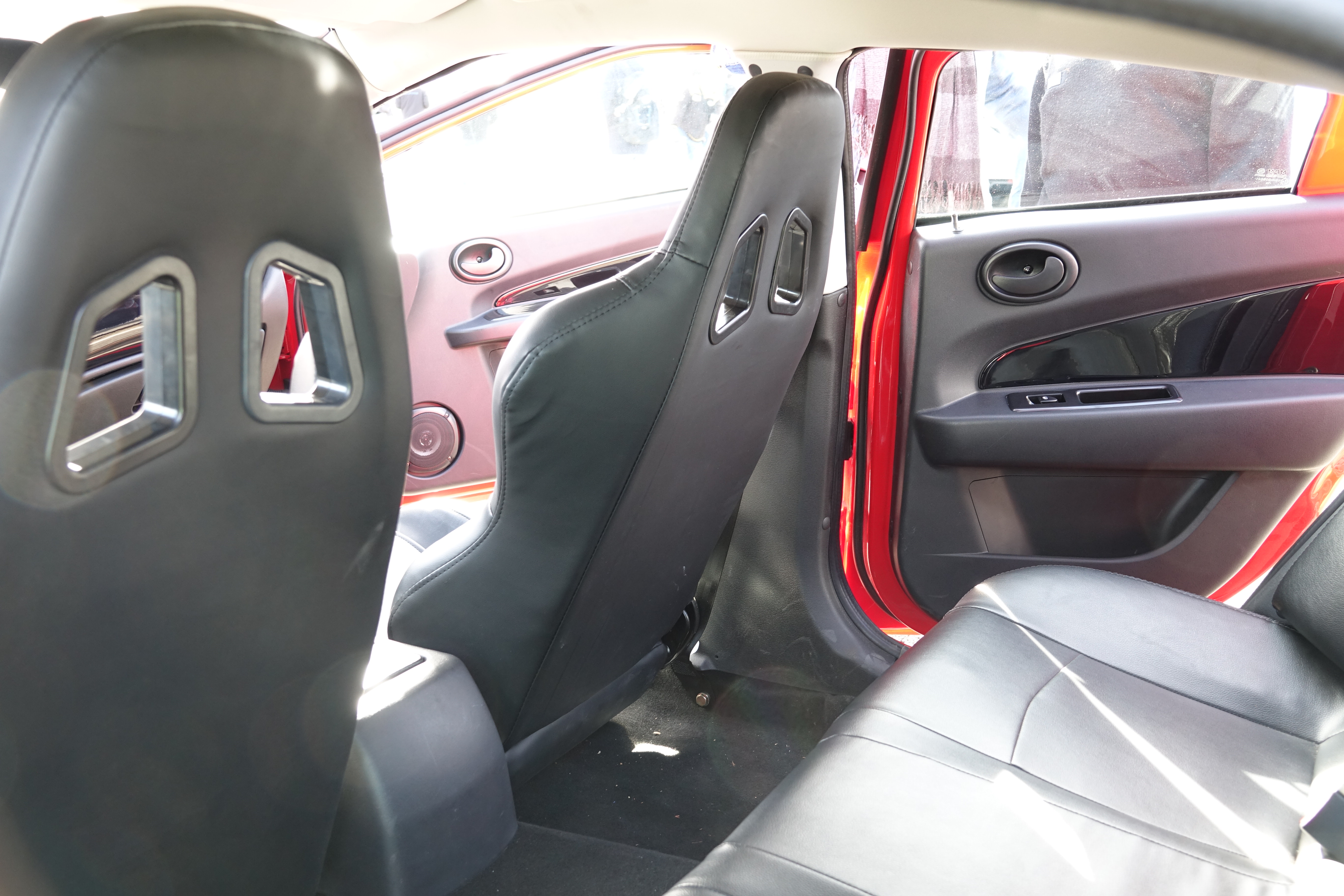
Erelis interior via backseat

The MPM Erelis offers only one package with the following equipment:

- Anti-intrusion alarm
- Air conditioner
- LED daytime running lights
- 18-inch aluminum wheels
- Heated mirrors
- Sports bucket seats
- Audio system HiFi MP3 4HP ALPINE Audio USB
