= National Audio Company =

Cassette tape manufacturing company

- Industry: Audio Cassette Tapes
- Founded: 1969
- Founder: Warren Stepp
- Headquarters: Springfield, Missouri, United States
- Products: Blank Audio Cassette Tapes, Cassette Tape Packaging, Digital Media
- Production output: 25-30 million cassettes per year
- Services: Cassette Tape Duplication, Vinyl Record Pressing, CD Duplication, Audio Engineering and Transfer, Cassette Manufacturing

National Audio Company is a cassette tape manufacturer located in Springfield, Missouri. It was established in 1968 by Steve Stepp and his father, Warren Stepp, and is the largest cassette tape manufacturer in the world.The National Audio Company produces millions of cassettes and works with over 5,000 independent labels each year. Since its inception, it has acted as a central force in the cassette culture and works to keep analog audio alive.

== History ==
The National Audio Company started in 1968 in Springfield, Missouri by Steve Stepp and his father Warren Stepp. The company primarily focused on the production of cassette tapes which were the main form of portable music during the time. Cassettes became a popular music medium due to its portability and small size. At the peak of their business, the National Audio Company was producing thousands of cassette an hour. Throughout the decades, as music has evolved, the Stepp’s have tried their hands at making other music media such as compact discs and VHS tapes.

The invention and popularization of the compact cassette kept the business in the public eye until the compact disc and other forms of music consumption, like music sharing and downloading sites, took over the market in the early 1990’s. The business has since downsized to fit with the modern demand but still maintain their quality in production. The company still remains the largest producer of cassettes producing 30 million cassettes a year.

== National presence and influence ==
The Springfield, Missouri based company makes Springfield the largest music cassette producer in the world. Stepp and his father opened the National Audio Company in Springfield because they both grew up there, and also because the city’s central location made it ideal for shipping nationwide. The National Audio Company was significant during the COVID-19 pandemic because artists were forced to cancel gigs, so for artists not signed to a major label, cassette tapes were their only way to produce new music. Along with the 30 million cassette tapes sold per year, National Audio Company also deals with more than 5,000 independent labels annually. National Audio Company has produced cassette tapes for major artists including Taylor Swift, Notorious BIG, Billie Eilish, and Lady Gaga. They also produced tens of thousands of cassettes for the soundtracks of both "Guardians of the Galaxy: Awesome Mix Vol.1" and "Guardians of the Galaxy Vol. 2: Awesome Mix Vol. 2 " at the request of Disney.

== Present day ==
As of the mid 2020's, National Audio Company remains the largest manufacturer of cassette tapes, producing around 30 million cassettes a year. The company is credited with sustaining the culture of cassette tapes even after its competitors halted manufacturing decades ago. Owner Steve Stepp said that their 95% market share makes them pivotal in maintaining the preservation of cassettes.

The resurgence of cassette tapes among younger generations of music fans, with majority of them being under the age of 35, has translated to an increase in demand, with sales numbers hitting record highs with no signs of ceasing. This interest is driven a shifting cultural landscape, leaning more towards collecting physical media. As a result of this, cassette production has expanded to new markets, reinforcing the longevity of this style of media.

In early 2023, National Audio Company put its downtown Springfield business up for sale with an asking price of $10,950,000. Despite that, corporate has emphasized that the sale only concerns the real estate of the building, not the company itself. It has been stated that cassette production will continue as long as the Stepp family keeps its ownership in the company.

National Audio Company has recently got in partnership with audio company ReVox for the production of premium and empty cassettes.. This allows for cassette tapes to be a medium of high-quality playback and recording in the audio landscape. National Audio Company is installing a production line at the ReVox manufacturing facility in Villingen, Germany, allowing for high-quality audio cassettes on site.
