= MPM Motors =

Defunct French car manufacturer

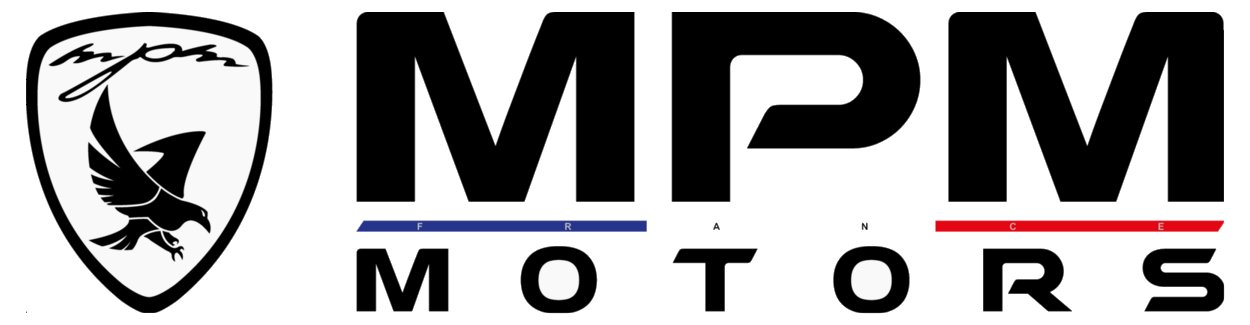
- Industry: Automotive
- Founded: 2015
- Defunct: 2021
- Headquarters: Croissy-sur-Seine, Yvelines, Île-de-France, France
- Key people: Oleg Paramonov, Director
- Products: Automobiles
- Website: Official site

MPM Motors was a French car manufacturer founded in September 2015. The first and only model developed by the manufacturer is the MPM Erelis (the evolution of the Tagaz Aquila/PS160, formerly produced by TagAZ in Russia), which was approved for Europe in December 2016.

== History ==
In 2015, the start-up MPM Motors was created in France, in Croissy-sur-Seine, by Oleg and Igor Paramonov, the sons of the industrialist Michael Paramonov who grew up in France. They decided to launch the brand there and named it MPM for Mr. Paramonov Manufacturing, in tribute to their father.

The start-up commenced development from the "Aquila" model, a project left fallow pending the demise of TagAZ and which had never had the means of its potential. The Aquila, which was originally developed in South Korea with a start of production in Russia, had been abandoned after the fall of the industrial group to which it belonged, Doninvest.

The adventure became concrete with the opening of the entirely manual production chain in the Saint Quentin en Yvelines agglomeration. in January 2016, thus allowing the creation of many jobs in the region.

European approval of the PS160 by UTAC in December 2016, was the starting point for MPM Motors. The company was developing future models of the brand in France in its offices in Croissy-sur-Seine.

Originally named "PS160", MPM renamed its coupé "Erelis" in August 2018 adopting the PSA 3-cylinder 1.2- liter turbocharged engine with 130 hp. The manufacturer exhibited the Erelis during Les Grandes Heures Automobiles in September 2018.

In March 2021 MPM Motors filed for bankruptcy.

== MPM Cup ==
MPM Motors is preparing a championship dedicated to MPM models. The MPM Cup takes place on French circuits from 2019.

== Products ==
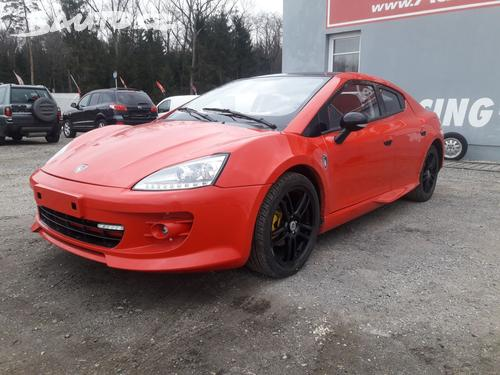
MPM Erelis in orange

The only current product is the MPM Erelis.

MPM was developing an SUV named Vultur which was 95% complete at the time the company filed for bankruptcy.
