= D/CAS =

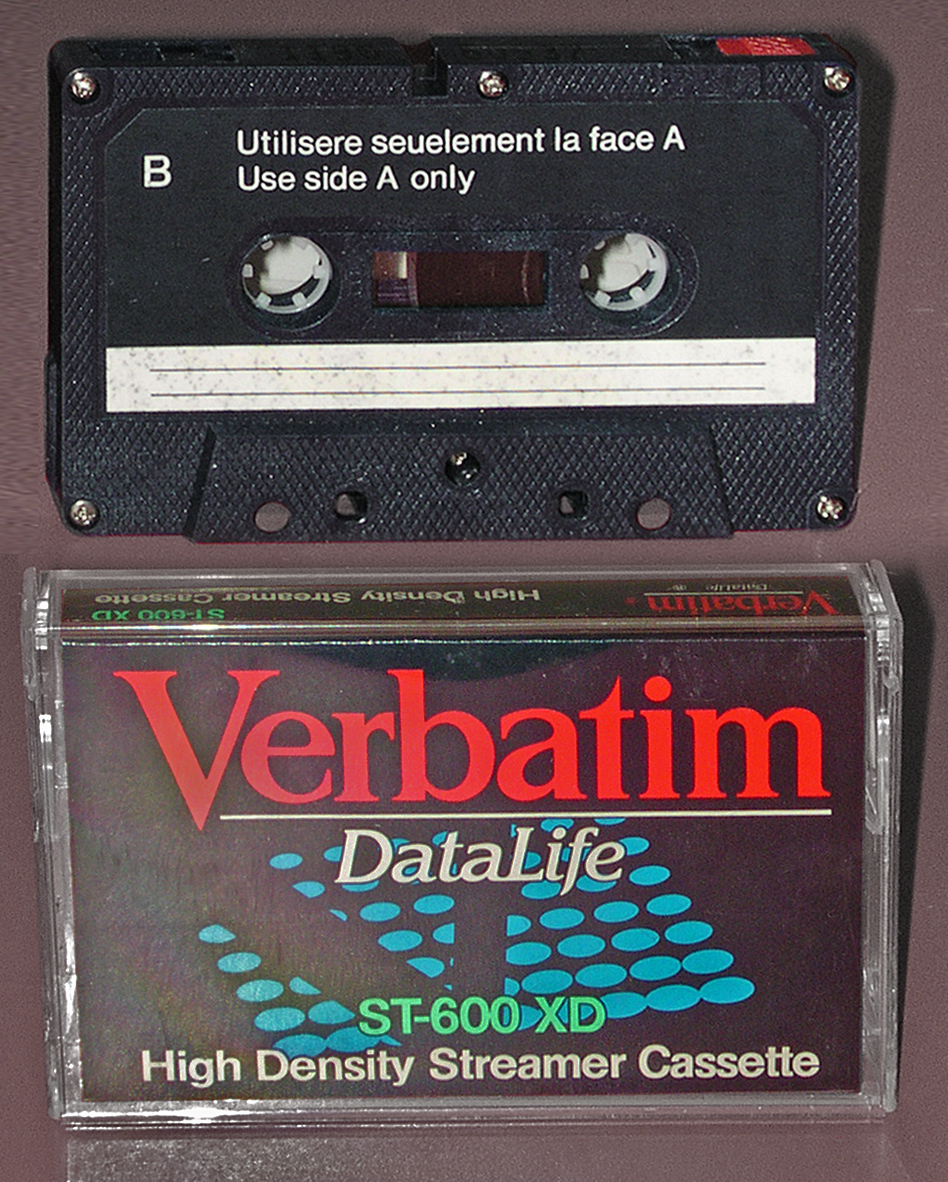
A D/CAS, aka "streamer" cassette, for data storage, adapted from the audio Compact Cassette format

D/CAS (Data/CASsette), also known as a streamer cassette, is a now-obsolete data backup technology that used an upgraded version of the common audio cassette tape and a specialized tape drive derived from an audio tape transport. Holding anywhere from 200 KB to 600 MB (in 1990), it was superseded by newer data backup formats such as Travan, QIC, DDS, and LTO.

Streamer cassettes look almost like a standard audio cassette, with the addition of a notch about one quarter inch wide and deep, situated slightly off-center at the top edge of the cassette. They also have a reusable write-protect tab on one side of the top edge, with the other side having either only an open rectangular hole, or no hole at all. Data was recorded across four tracks in a serpentine manner across the whole width of the tape, much like newer formats such as QIC or Travan, making them single-sided.

Streamer cassettes can be used in an audio cassette deck, but the formulation of tape they contain is optimized only for full-saturation square wave digital data, resulting in audio recordings made on them having very poor audio quality and a large amount of noise and distortion.

== See also ==
- Magnetic-tape data storage

== Sources ==
- "YourDictionary D/CAS definition". Your Dictionary (yourdictionary.com). Archived from the original on 15 April 2013.
- "Teac D/CAS cassettes catalogue". Pacific Data (pacificdatastorage.com). Archived from the original on 27 October 2013.
- "Tape backup explanation". ThinkQuest (thinkquest.org). Archived from the original on 29 June 2012.
- Museum of Obsolete Media's page on streamer cassettes
