= Personics =

- Company type: Corporation
- Industry: Music
- Founded: 1986; 39 years ago in Menlo Park, California, United States
- Defunct: 1991
- Headquarters: Redwood City, California, United States
- Products: Personics Music Maker System

Personics was the company that invented the music recording retail system with trade name "Personics System" that was introduced in record stores starting in 1987. The system allowed customers to enter a music store, use headphones to preview and select individual songs on a console, then specify a custom list of songs to be recorded to a Compact Cassette tape. The songs available were also listed in magazine format available at the stores. The record stores had a machine from Personics that contained 120 custom Compact discs (2 drives with 60 discs each) recorded in CD Digital Audio Redbook format with custom Dolby AC1 (DP85) tracks which were also pre-encoded with Dolby B Type Noise reduction prior to compression. These two drives each had jukebox disc changing systems and provided access to thousands of songs for fast (8x speed) in-shell cassette recording.

Songs and other musical selections could be selected from a variety of artists, record labels, genres, etc. and arranged in practically any order desired. The software calculated the total playing time of the selections, instructed the clerk to insert the appropriate length cassette, and provided the option to shuffle selections in order to even up the playing time on each side. After operating a control on the console to commit to purchase the list of songs, followed by a short waiting period (1/8 the length of the playing time of the material selected), the cassette recording would be finished, along with a custom printed label with personalized title and listing the song selections in the specified order. The customer would then pay for and receive the recorded tape from a clerk at the store's register.

== History ==
The system saw some popularity around the time when the Sony Walkman and other portable cassette players had already become popular. It allowed customers to purchase songs individually, rather than purchasing an entire LP or CD (album) just to obtain one or two songs to record to tape. During this time, the 45 RPM single had started to lose popularity, limiting the ability of the public to purchase songs individually. The Personics system was initially successful and then suffered due to lack of new catalog material. Customers lost interest in cassettes and the systems; Personics filed for bankruptcy in 1991, years before MP3 and other portable digital players became a major market force.
