= XDR (audio) =

Audio cassette quality-control and duplication process

The XDR logo, on the label and case insert of cassettes duplicated with the XDR process

XDR (expanded dynamic range), also known as SDR (super dynamic range), is a quality-control and duplication process for the mass-production of pre-recorded audio cassettes. It is a process designed to provide higher quality audio on pre-recorded cassettes by checking the sound quality at all stages of the tape duplication process. In this way, the dynamic range of audio recorded on an XDR-duplicated cassette can be up to 13 decibels greater.

== History ==
XDR (expanded dynamic range) was originally developed by Capitol Records in LA in their R&D facility.

Before they had released anything, Capitol Records-EMI of Canada was made aware of this activity and was able to release their own version called SDR (Super Dynamic Range) ahead of the American version. They managed this because:

- Back in the early 80's Capitol Records Canada functioned separately from their US counterparts.
- Capitol Records Canada only involved a three person team to bring this to fruition.
- Capitol Records LA had the added complexity of developing the system in kit form to ship out to its manufacturing facilities.
- Capitol Records LA developed a sophisticated high speed tone generator to inject tones into the slave duplicators. Instead of which, Capitol Records Canada designed a real time test tone generator and recorded these tones onto the one inch master along with the music; which not only reduced design time but also allowed Capitol Records Canada to test the entire chain from master tape to final cassette.

After some time Capitol Records Canada was asked to re-brand to "XDR". to put Capitol Records Canada in line with the rest of Capitol Records.

== Process ==
The XDR/SDR process involves many steps, the most prominent being:

- Duplication of the cassettes from a 1"-wide master loop tape mounted in a loop bin duplicator (as opposed to standard cassette duplication using a 1/2" master loop tape), resulting in clearer high frequencies, greater bass response, and less noise.
- On some cassettes was the use of digital tapes to prepare the wide-track duplication masters.
- Recording a short test toneburst at the beginning and end of the program material on the cassettes, to detect for any loss of audio frequencies in the audio spectrum. These tones are recorded then read during the duplication process to detect if there is any loss of any audio information.

As well as with EMI & Capitol Records, PolyGram and other labels also offered cassette releases duplicated with the XDR process.

== Test Tones ==
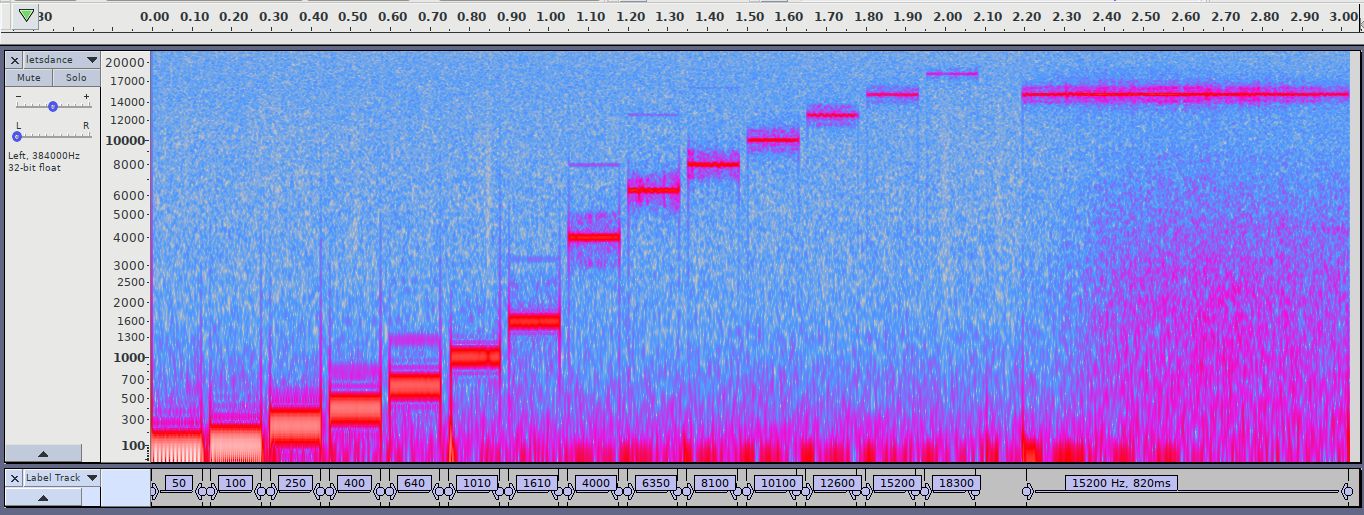
Spectrogram of SDR Soundburst from cassette of David Bowie's "Let's Dance"

SDR toneburst
Recreation of SDR toneburst (as used by EMI Canada in 1982)

XDR toneburst
Recreation of the XDR toneburst

Several different tonebursts were used during the life of the XDR/SDR process.

- 15 sinewave tones, all but the last 0.127 seconds in length with 0.023 seconds of silence between tones, of the following estimated frequencies: 50, 100, 250, 400, 640, 1010, 1610, 4000, 6350, 8100, 10100, 12600, 15200, and 18300 Hz, followed by 130 ms of silence, then 820 ms of a 15200 Hz tone. (Used by EMI Canada in 1982, as SDR.)
- 11 sinewave tones, again 0.127 s in length with 0.023 s of silence between tones, of the following estimated frequencies: 32, 64, 128, 256, 512, 1000, 2000, 4000, 8820, 11025, and 18000 Hz.
- Chords of F# sinewave tones ranging from roughly 46.25 Hz (F#1) to 17739 Hz (C#10).

== Album ID ==
Listen to an example of XDR's dual tones

Example XDR data: Chameleon Records #74819
470Hz	604Hz	*
470Hz	816Hz	D
470Hz	816Hz	D
426Hz	604Hz	7
426Hz	604Hz	7
385Hz	604Hz	4
426Hz	668Hz	8
348Hz	604Hz	1
426Hz	738Hz	9
385Hz	816Hz	B

XDR tonebursts tend to be at both the beginning of side 1 and end of side 2. Some XDR cassettes include a series of DTMF-like dual-tones after the second toneburst at the end of the tape which uniquely identifies the album. Each dual-tone is 65 milliseconds long and separated by 35 milliseconds of silence. XDR's dual-tones are a modified form of DTMF where each of the two frequencies is one-half the usual specification.

XDR's modified DTMF frequencies (with sound)
	604.5 Hz	668.0 Hz	738.5 Hz	816.5 Hz
348.5 Hz	1	2	3	A
385.0 Hz	4	5	6	B
426.0 Hz	7	8	9	C
470.5 Hz	*	0	#	D

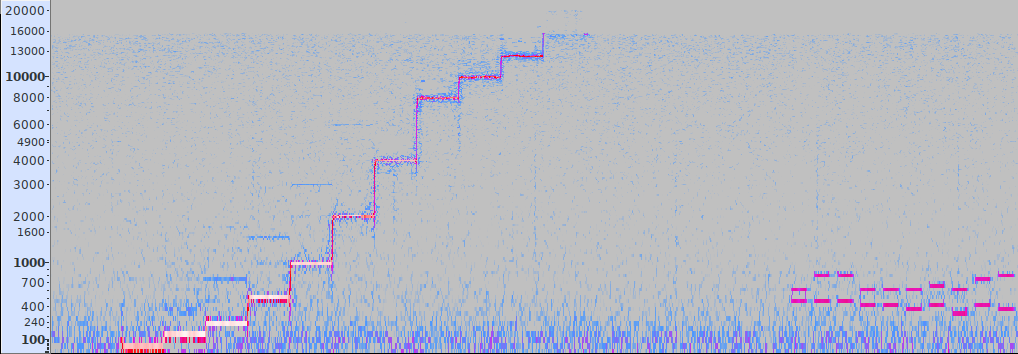
Note the dual tone data following the XDR soundburst.
