= Tagaz Aquila =

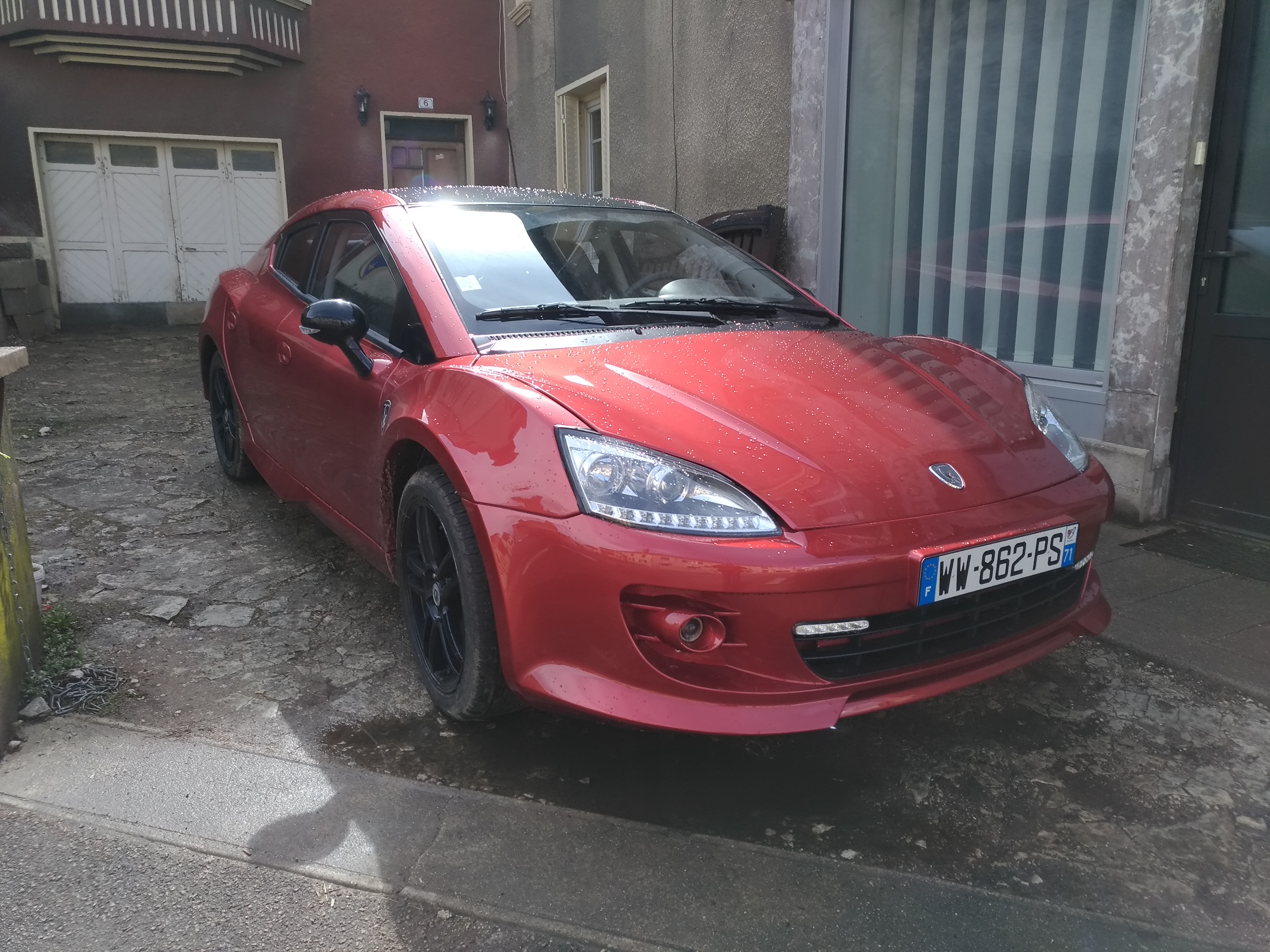

Overview
- Manufacturer: TagAZ
- Production: March 2013 – January 2014
- Assembly: Russia: Taganrog

Body and chassis
- Class: Compact car
- Body style: 4-door sedan
- Layout: FF layout

Powertrain
- Engine: 1.6 L Mitsubishi 4G18 I4
- Transmission: 5-speed manual

Dimensions
- Wheelbase: 2,750 mm (108.3 in)
- Length: 4,683 mm (184.4 in)
- Width: 1,824 mm (71.8 in)
- Height: 1,388 mm (54.6 in)
- Kerb weight: 1,410 kg (3,109 lb)

The TagAZ Aquila (Ru:ТагАЗ Аквилла; Latin for Eagle) is a compact car formerly produced by TagAZ, now defunct, in Taganrog, Russia. The Aquila is marketed by TagAZ as a "four-door coupe". The car is powered by a 107 hp Mitsubishi 4G18 I4 engine with a 5-speed manual transmission. The car has a steel spaceframe covered with plastic body panels.

== History ==
The Aquila went on sale in Russia in March, 2013.

TagAZ was declared bankrupt on January 21, 2014, meaning that the future of the model is unclear.

The basic model includes air conditioning, power windows, central locking, electrically adjustable heated mirrors, radio cassette, power steering, alloy wheels, driver's airbag and ABS. The car was sold at a price of 415,000 rubles on the terms of obtaining a car at the TagAZ plant .

Only about 200 were produced by the time production stopped.

== Production in France ==
The TagAZ Aquila was also produced in Europe, in the Paris suburbs by small-scale producer of cars, by MPM Motors (Mikhail Paramonov Manufacturing). The Aquila is called the MPM Erelis. Company on 2021 went bankrupt. Aquila price tag was from 10.000 euro till 30.000 euro depending on the version.
