= Nicolai Jørgensgaard Graakjær =

Danish professor

- Born: 22.10.1972; Aarhus, Denmark
- Occupation: Professor
- Employer: Aalborg University

Nicolai Jørgensgaard Graakjær (born 22.10.1972) is a Danish Professor at the Department of Culture and Communications at Aalborg University. His research areas are music in advertising, sound branding, sounds of sports, and social psychology.

== Education and career ==
Nicolai Jørgensgaard Graakjær holds a degree in music (1997) and psychology (1999) from Aalborg University. From 1997 to 1999 he was also a guest lector at Aalborg University. Afterwards, he was a high school teacher for a year where he also completed the professional postgraduate teacher training. From 2000-2003 he was a teaching assistant. In 2008 he received his Ph.D. in music in tv-commercials and he is a leading Professor in this area.

From 2010 he has been head of the knowledge group MÆRKK of the Department of Communications and Psychology at Aalborg University. From 2022 he has served as the head of the section Mediated Communication at the Department of Culture and Communication. He has also been Editor-in-Chief for Mediekultur (2008-2012) and for MÆRKK – Æstetik og Kommunikation / Aalborg Universitetsforlag (2012-2020).

Moreover, he has appeared in the media often.

== Publications ==
Nicolai Jørgensgaard Graakjær has published over 100 publications including 8 books:

- Graakjær, N. J. (2026). Popular Music and Football. Cambridge University Press.
- Graakjær, N. J. (2023). The Sounds of Spectators at Football. Bloomsbury Academic.
- Jessen, I. B., & Graakjær, N. J. (Eds.) (2020). Medieæstetik - Politik, hverdagsliv og forbrugskultur. (1 ed.) Aalborg Universitetsforlag. MÆRKK – Æstetik og Kommunikation
- Allingham, P., Graakjær, N. J., Grøn, R., & Jantzen, C. (Eds.) (2019). Stemningens æstetik. Aalborg Universitetsforlag. MÆRKK – Æstetik og Kommunikation No. 8
- Graakjaer, Nicolai (27 November 2014). Analyzing Music in Advertising. doi:10.4324/9781315770277. ISBN 978-1-317-67190-9.
- Graakjær, N. J., & Jessen, I. B. (Eds.) (2015). Selektion: Om udvælgelse af medietekster til analyse. Systime Academic. MÆRKK – Æstetik og Kommunikation No. 4
- Graakjær, N. J. (2011). Musik i tv-reklamer: Teori og analyse. (1 ed.). Samfundslitteratur.
- Graakjær, N. J., & Jantzen, C. (Eds.) (2009). Music in Advertising: Commercial Sounds in Media Communication and Other Settings. Aalborg Universitetsforlag.

Other selected publications:

- Graakjær, N. J. (2025). Sounding out the electric vehicle engine – sounds of sustainability? Continuum. Journal of Media & Cultural Studies, 39(5), 719-730. https://doi.org/10.1080/10304312.2025.2532131
- Graakjær, N. J. (2021). Club Foot for football – on the (re)construction of meanings of music and football through a television title sequence. Sport in Society, 24(1), 22-37. https://doi.org/10.1080/17430437.2020.1795133
- Graakjær, N. J. (2021). The sounds of Coca-Cola - on "Cola-nization" of sound and music. In J. Deaville, S-L. Tan, & R. Rodman (Eds.), The Oxford Handbook of Music and Advertising (pp. 397–413). Oxford University Press.
- Graakjær, N. J. (2020). Sounds of soccer on-screen: A critical re-evaluation of the role of spectator sounds. The Journal of Popular Television, 8(2), 143-158. https://doi.org/10.1386/jptv_00015_1
- Graakjær, N. J. (2020). ‘Listen to the atmosphere!’: On spectator sounds and their potentially disruptive role in a football simulation video game. The Soundtrack, 11(1-2), 39-55. https://doi.org/10.1386/ts_00004_1
- Graakjær, N. J. (2019). Sounding out i’m lovin’ it – a multimodal discourse analysis of the sonic logo in commercials for McDonald’s 2003–2018. Critical Discourse Studies, 16(5), 569-582. https://doi.org/10.1080/17405904.2019.1624184
- Graakjær, Nicolai Jørgensgaard; Bonde, Anders (21 June 2018). "Non-musical sound branding – a conceptualization and research overview". European Journal of Marketing. 52 (7/8): 1505–1525. doi:10.1108/EJM-09-2017-0609.
- Graakjær, N. J. (2014). The Bonding of a Band and a Brand: On Music Placement in Television Commercials from a Text Analytical Perspective. Popular Music & Society, 37(5), 517-537. https://doi.org/10.1080/03007766.2013.861242
- Jessen, I. B., & Graakjær, N. J. (2013). Cross-media communication in advertising: exploring multimodal connections between television commercials and websites. Visual Communication, 12(4), 437-458. https://doi.org/10.1177/1470357213497665
- Graakjær, N. J. (2012). Dance in the store: on the use and production of music in Abercrombie & Fitch. Critical Discourse Studies, 9(4), 393-406. https://doi.org/10.1080/17405904.2012.713208
