= RFV =

RFV may refer to:

- Radio Free Virgin, a former broadcaster
- Radial force variation, a property of a tire
