= Music on hold =

Telephone business practice

A piece of music that composer Kevin MacLeod describes as being suitable for hold music

Music on hold (MOH) or hold music is the business practice of playing recorded music to fill the silence that would be heard by telephone callers who have been placed on hold. It is especially common in situations involving customer service.

== Development ==
Music on hold was created by Alfred Levy, an inventor, factory owner, and entrepreneur. In 1962, Levy discovered a problem with the phone lines at his factory: a loose wire was touching a metal girder on the building. This made the building a giant receiver, so that the audio broadcast signal from a radio station next door would transmit through the loose wire, and could be heard when calls were put on hold. Levy patented his work in 1966. While other advancements have come to change and enhance the technology, it was this initial patent creation that began the evolution for today's music on hold.

== Equipment and formats ==
Older MOH systems were integrated into telephone systems designed for businesses via an audio jack on the telephone equipment labeled "MOH".

Today, equipment that supports physical media usually plays CDs. Some older systems may still use cassette tapes (sometimes employing endless-loops), or reel-to-reel tape players. In each case, the unit loads the media into a digital memory chip to prevent premature wearing of the mechanical parts.

Equipment that supports virtual media generally plays MP3 files. Several types of units play these files. USB flash drive units allow an MP3 file to be received electronically, downloaded to a flash drive and connected to the player. Ethernet based remote load units connect via the network to a remote IP address. Phone line based remote load systems allow for a connection via an analog telephone line and dialing the number belonging to the unit. For VoIP phone systems, MP3s are loaded without any equipment.

Newer technology allows MP3 files to be downloaded automatically from the internet so that messages (or interesting content in the form of news and weather, among many) can be changed daily. The new "online on hold" technology makes the older technology redundant since it requires no additional hardware. All these systems allow analog-to-digital audio storage and playback.

As of 2011, technology allows productions to be downloaded or streamed via the Internet, or played through a USB flash drive.

Modern wireless telephony relies on lossy audio codecs optimized for spoken voice transmissions, which dramatically reduces the necessary bandwidth at the expense of making any non-spoken content, such as music on hold, sound distorted.

== Consumer perceptions ==
A number of studies have been conducted, which highlight consumer perceptions of music on hold, reinforcing its use by businesses to improve standards of call handling.

A survey of more than 2,000 UK consumers commissioned by audio branding specialist PHMG revealed 70% of consumers are put on hold for more than 50% of their calls. When put on hold, 73% of callers want to hear something other than beeps or silence.

A CNN survey found that 70 percent of callers in the United States who hold the line in silence hang up within 60 seconds. Meanwhile, research by North American Telecom found callers hearing music on hold will stay on the line 30 seconds longer than callers experiencing silence.

== Source of music ==
=== Radio ===
The musical source may be as simple as playing a local radio station through the MOH jack. This is unlawful without the express permission of the music title and mechanical copyright holders, or their representatives.

- Although radio stations may provide the desired musical format, there is no control over the specific songs that are played, some of which may be offensive to the callers, or depending on the music played, sound harsh in monaural sound. This kind of system is also vulnerable to interference.
- Radio stations typically do not license their music for MOH systems. In the United States, the radio broadcaster has no legal right to provide such a license as they, themselves, obtain a usage license from the music title owner for the right to broadcast said music for limited and personal use. Re-broadcasting of a radio program over a phone system calls for licensing and copyright arrangements to be made for the owner of the MOH system.
- Most radio stations (excluding those that are part of non-commercial educational radio networks) will play commercials, which may be offensive or annoying to the caller. Furthermore, it is possible that a competitor's commercial may be played, which would be counter-productive (see Legal aspects).

Owners of radio stations will usually air their broadcast signal as music on hold, using their main program signal, if there are several. Examples include RÚV from Iceland using Rás 1 as the on-hold music.

=== Off-the-shelf commercial CDs ===
Commercial CDs eliminate the problems encountered with radio commercials, and they offer control over the selection of music; they do not, however, grant proper license for MOH use unless users first obtain permission from the song title copyright owner (when the song is not in the "public domain") and the mechanical copyright owner, or bodies that represent them, such as BMI or ASCAP. (See "Radio," above, for more details.)

=== Stock MOH CDs (with or without voice-overs) ===
CDs are available that have been specifically recorded and licensed for MOH systems. These may contain only music, or may include periodic voice-overs with messages such as "Your call is important" or "Please stay on the line". Such off-the-shelf recordings may be generic or may be specific to individual industries, but will not be customized for individual companies.

=== Custom-designed MOH ===
In general, custom music on hold allows an organisation to:

1. Control content
2. Control music genre
3. Use the on hold time to sell to a captive audience
4. Through a reputable on hold company be fully licensed and legal for music playback
5. Reduce hang-ups and make the business look more professional
6. Control length of programming based on average caller hold-time

CDs (or other MOH formats, such as MP3 files) can be custom-created to suit the particular needs of a business. The announcements can be scripted to emphasize particular attributes of the business such as location, store hours, or special promotions or services. These are typically used for up-selling and cross-selling callers. Companies can either record the messages themselves, or hire a music on hold production company.

=== Online on hold ===
A program loaded onto an existing computer and connected to the phone system can allow automatic content updates interspersed with company information.

=== Streaming MOH ===
Streaming MOH refers to a live music on hold stream (URL-based delivery) which can also include custom content. Streaming MOH can also refer to a streaming media server, as with Cisco Unified Call Manager, in which case RTP format is used.

=== Free on-hold programs ===
Programs available to non-profit organizations at no cost. Very few companies offer absolutely free programs. The programs are available in generic and custom formats, and are delivered at no cost to the requesting organization.

== Styles of music ==
The style of music played by MOH systems depends largely on the type of business offering the service. It is generally best to present music that will not be offensive to the audience, but that would also be of particular interest to the typical caller. A western apparel store may choose to play country music. A Christian book store may choose to play popular Christian music. A university may choose to play classical music. An athletic ticket office may choose to play the team or school's fight song. Light classics, smooth jazz, bossa nova and beautiful music are common choices, as is fully synthesized melodic music.

=== Cisco's Opus Number One ===
Among the best known due to its default presence on Cisco Unified Communications Manager is "Opus Number One" by Tim Carleton and high-school friend Darrick Deel, who recorded it on a four-track tape recorder in 1989. In a YouTube video, Carleton mentioned the following on how he created the sound and why the stereo version is not very good:

The reason was that I used an Alesis Midiverb II or III, specifically the 3-tap pan, to hide the fact that I was playing this live on a DX7IIFD and the notes would either cut off when I'd play unison patches and run out of polyphony or when I'd change patches. Solution: Plug it in mono to the Midiverb on one side, R8 on the other side, stereo into the Tascam, and go.

— Tim Carleton

Deel went on to work for Cisco in building the company's first VoIP phone. When a need for default on hold music came up, he recalled the track he and Carleton had recorded and reached out to Carleton for approval.

The hold music was later featured in a 2023 Bud Light commercial that aired during Super Bowl LVII.

It has also featured in the This American Life episode "Stuck in the Middle", wherein a man is obsessed with finding the name and creator of the "haunting" melody.

"Opus Number One" was covered by American rock band Osees as "LADWP Hold" and featured as the closing track on their 2023 album Intercepted Message.

The tune made a brief cameo at Apple's WWDC 2025 conference during the presentation of iOS 26's Hold Assist feature.

In 2026, a dance emote named "Opus NO. 1" consisting of the music was added to the video game Fortnite.

== Recent trends ==
With the application of newer equipment, MoH devices can now interact with the caller. No additional programs are required on the platform, as all the logic is done with the MoH device. This can include services such as 'polling on hold', rating customer service officer anonymously, etc.

The trend toward hosted IP telephony for business phone systems is demanding changes in music on hold message technology.

== Copyright issues ==
Most musical compositions and associated sound recordings (phonograms) used as hold music are protected by copyright. Transmitting a piece of music over a telephone line is considered a "public performance" of both the musical work and the sound recording under United States copyright law, so permission from the copyright owners is generally required. Commercial music services provide hold music to businesses, ensuring that the musical works and sound recordings are properly licensed.

In the United States, performing rights organizations (PROs) such as ASCAP, BMI, SESAC, and GMR administer public performance rights for millions of musical compositions on behalf of their copyright owners (songwriters and publishers). These PROs sell blanket licenses which allow business customers to play any musical works included in their catalogs. Additionally, a mechanical license may be required to reproduce the musical work, i.e. to upload a copy of it to the phone system used by the business. Royalty-free music may be used instead.

Permission is also required to use a particular sound recording of a musical composition, since the copyright owner has the right to authorize public performance of the sound recording "by means of a digital audio transmission." Commercial music services pay royalties to sound recording copyright owners through an organization known as SoundExchange.

=== Copyright law ===
In the US, and other countries where copyright laws are practiced, authors are granted copyright protection on their musical compositions. Such copyright protection has existed since just after the turn of the 20th century, and most music written before 1900–1910 from impressionism back to baroque and antiquity is said to be "in the public domain". Use of any said music prior to the creation of these copyright laws may be presumed to be free for use by all, although individual titles may have been later copyrighted through a change in the composition or arrangement. The use of copyrighted music is not for free use in the public domain.

All music written after this period, which is copyrighted under multiple acts of congress, is owned by the author(s) or their assignees. The use of this music is protected and controlled so that the owner may derive usage income. Specific to telephonic MOH (music-on-hold), the US laws currently protect the copyright owners from unlawful, unpermitted use of their music titles in over-the-phone broadcast. Any person or business wishing to use current, popular, post 1900–1910, copyrighted music for MOH purposes may only lawfully do so by obtaining permission from the owner. Currently, performance rights societies such as ASCAP, BMI, and SESAC will sell blanket permission to use music titles in their catalog for MOH purposes. for an express annual fee, calculated by size and frequency of usage. Failure to obtain this paid permission is a violation of US copyright laws.

This same copyright protection is also true in the rebroadcast of any radio program. As mentioned earlier, the broadcaster has been assigned a narrow and specific usage license to air copyrighted song titles. This does not include permission to any person or business to re-broadcast that program on telephonic MOH. The broadcaster may not promote such unlawful use and is not an owner who has any lawful right to grant MOH usage permission. They do not hold the ownership of the title and have no right to license use in any way. Those who plug radio broadcast into their telephone MOH without first obtaining paid permission through the owner's agents (ASCAP, BMI, or SESAC) may be in violation of copyright law and may be prosecuted under existing federal laws.

=== Mechanical copyright ===
A second copyright exists when it comes to licensing use for telephonic MOH. A piece of music, as mentioned above, is copyrighted and may be licensed for use as a music title and is understood to be a combination of melody, harmony, and, where applicable, lyrics. However, neither radio listeners nor MOH listeners could hear this music unless it was recorded, providing a delivery medium whereby the "music" becomes a "performance". As mentioned elsewhere, in countries such as the US, where said copyright laws are enforced, nearly every recording of a song title holds its own "mechanical copyright".

For most of the 20th century, music was recorded in studios, produced by record company executives, producers, arrangers, and engineers who were hired to deliver the artist's finished recordings for mastering and duplication, for sale on various types of media: 78, 45, and 33 RPM vinyl; reel-to-reel; 8-track tape; cassette; and compact disc. To protect their investment, the record companies obtain a mechanical copyright in order to protect and control the recording with which they derive usage and sales income.

For those still uncertain of the difference between "song title" and "mechanical" copyrights, consider the Capitol Records lawsuit for copyright infringement against Nike in 1987. Nike legally obtained permission to use the Beatles song title "Revolution" from the title's owner, Michael Jackson. They used the Capitol Records-owned recording of the Beatles' performance, but failed to obtain and pay for permission and use. Capitol Records sued and prevailed because Nike only had a license to use the title and did not have a license to use the mechanical recording.

Therefore, persons or businesses wishing to play music that falls "in the public domain" are still legally required to obtain permission to use the mechanical recording of this music, from the mechanical copyright holder. Where the use is of copyrighted music, the same applies. In all cases, before a song title may be broadcast on a telephone MOH, said use must be approved and licensed from BOTH the "song title" copyright owner (if it is not in public domain) and the "mechanical" copyright owner.

=== Enforcement ===
It is generally known within the on-hold industry that some performance rights societies, with regional offices and staff, both monitor and prosecute persons and businesses that infringe on the copyright of title holders in their libraries. ASCAP and BMI are both aggressive about this, from time to time. It is not known whether any record companies are currently or actively monitoring and prosecuting violators of their mechanical license.

== Market ==
The global background music industry is worth $1.92 billion as of 2025.

=== Notable companies ===
As of 2010, the music-on-hold/message-on-hold industry has more than 300 different vendors to choose from producing custom content amounting to less than $1m in sales per company—including various manufacturers of specific-duty, message-on-hold devices.

- Muzak Corporation
- Grace Digital
- PH Media Group

== In popular culture ==
In a Bud Light commercial aired during the Super Bowl LVII telecast in 2023, actor Miles Teller, his wife and their dog start dancing to "Opus Number One" on her phone while waiting to talk to a customer service representative.

== See also ==
- Background music
- Elevator music
- On hold messaging
