= On hold messaging =

Telephone marketing technique

On-hold messaging is a service used by businesses and organizations to deliver information to their callers waiting on hold or while they are being transferred. Also called audio marketing, on-hold messaging is a specialist area of marketing and branding.

The commercial use of on-hold messaging began in the early 1980s. One of the earliest companies in this space was Premier Technologies, which developed dedicated on-hold audio devices.

== Background ==
An AT&T study found that more than 70% of business phone calls in the United States are placed on hold for an average of 45 to 60 seconds each. A USA Today study found executives spend 15 minutes a day or 68 hours a year on hold. A CNN survey found that 70% of callers in the United States who are holding the line in silence hang up within 60 seconds. A study by North American Telecom found that callers hearing music on hold will stay on the line 30 seconds longer than callers experiencing silence, and callers hearing commercials on hold will stay on the line for up to 3 minutes longer.

In November 2011 an omnibus survey of more than 2,000 UK consumers highlighted several key figures related to modern business communications and specifically to on hold messaging. Conducted by ICM on behalf of audio branding specialist PHMG (company), the survey found:
70% of consumers are put on hold for more than 50% of their calls; 68% of consumers are put on hold for longer than one minute; 73% of consumers want to hear something other than beeps or silence while on hold; 72% of personal calls to businesses are made at home on a landline; 60% of consumers are in front of a computer while on hold.

== Recent trends ==
Particularly in the United Kingdom, there has been an increasing move among businesses towards the use of regional accents and dialect in their on-hold marketing. Research conducted by audio branding specialist PHMG (company) among UK businesses discovered a 27% rise in the use of accents between January 2012 and January 2013.

Rather than selecting a generic or neutral voice style, companies may instead choose to deploy the regional accent which best represents their brand. This may be an accent specific to their location or simply one which best reflects their perceived values. In particular, research found the Scottish accent is perceived as trustworthy and reassuring while the Yorkshire accent, used by brands such as O2 (United Kingdom) in television and radio advertising, is seen as wise and honest.

A 2014 study among 1,000 UK consumers, conducted by PHMG (company), aimed to determine perceptions of business call handling standards. It found just 23% of British people are happy with the way their calls to business are handled, with satisfaction levels being particularly low among the older generations - just 12% of 55- to 64-year-olds claimed to be satisfied. Despite this, it also found 45% of UK consumers are happy to hold longer than a minute during calls to businesses and only 6% are not willing to wait at all.

Identical research conducted in the USA among 2,234 consumers also found less than a third of Americans are satisfied with the way businesses handle their calls. Similar to the UK, older generations are less satisfied, with only 28% of 45- to 64-year-olds claiming to be happy with how their calls are handled, compared to 37% of 18- to 34-year-olds. There is little variation between regions, although people in the South and the Northeast were found to be most satisfied (33%), followed by the Midwest (32%) and the West (31%).

== See also ==
- Music on hold
