= WorldDAB =

Non-profit organization

WorldDAB is a global industry non-profit organisation responsible for defining the standards of the Eureka-147 family, which includes the DAB (Digital Audio Broadcasting) and DAB+ standards of digital radio. WorldDAB oversees the DAB/DAB+ standard, ensuring compatibility between broadcast and receiver equipment; supervising upgrades, and future proofing the technology. WorldDAB is based in Geneva with headquarters in London.

The membership consists of over 80 companies and organisations around the world. They include public and private broadcasters, receiver and electronic equipment manufacturers, car manufacturers, data providers, transmission providers, regulators and government bodies.

== Countries represented ==
- Australia
- Belgium
- Brunei
- Canada
- China
- Czech Republic
- Denmark
- France
- Germany
- Gibraltar
- Hong Kong
- Ireland
- Hungary
- Israel
- Italy
- Japan
- Malaysia
- Malta
- Monaco
- Netherlands
- New Zealand
- Norway
- Poland
- Romania
- Singapore
- South Africa
- South Korea
- Spain
- Switzerland
- Taiwan
- United Kingdom
- United States
