= Digital Audio Broadcasting =

Digital radio standard

Official DAB+ logo

Official DAB logo (1990s–2018)

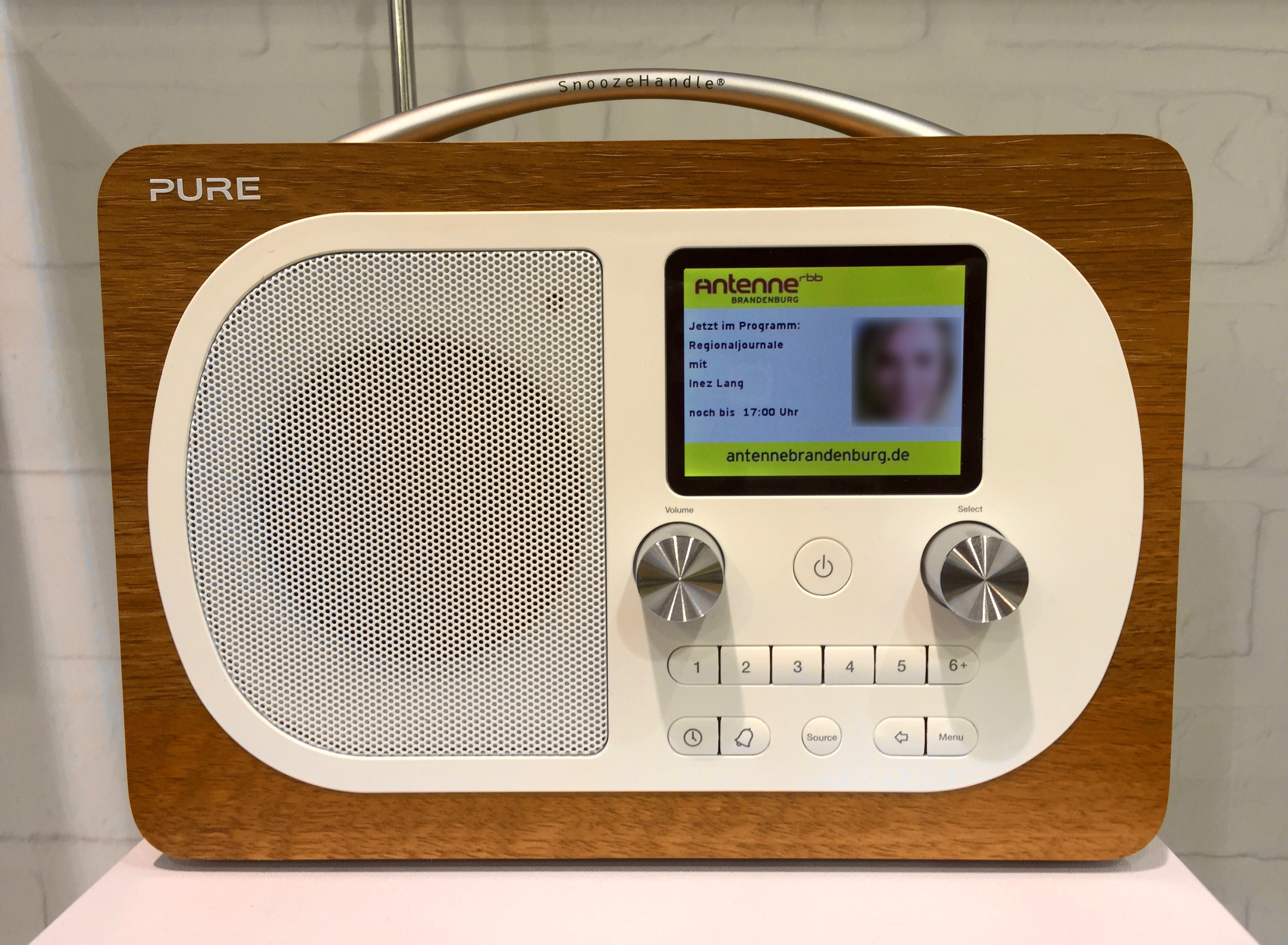
A Pure DAB receiver

Digital Audio Broadcasting (DAB) is a digital radio standard for broadcasting digital audio radio services in many countries around the world, defined, supported, marketed and promoted by the WorldDAB organization. The standard is dominant in Europe and is also used in Australia, and in parts of Africa and as of 2025, 55 countries are actively running DAB broadcasts as an alternative platform to analogue FM.

DAB was the result of a European research project and was first publicly released in 1995, with consumer-grade DAB receivers appearing around the late 1990s. Initially it was expected in many countries that existing FM services would switch over to DAB, although the take-up of DAB has been much slower than expected. In 2017, Norway became the first country to have implemented a national FM radio switch-off, with Switzerland to follow in 2026 (this decision has since been reversed) and other territories in the process of planning a switch-off. Terrestrial digital radio has become a requirement for all new cars (not buses and trucks) sold in the EU since 2021.

The original version of DAB used the MP2 audio codec; an upgraded version of the system was later developed and released named DAB+ which uses the HE-AAC v2 (AAC+) audio codec and is more robust and efficient. DAB is not forward compatible with DAB+. Today the majority of DAB broadcasts around the world are using the upgraded DAB+ standard, with only the UK still using a significant number of legacy DAB broadcasts.

DAB is generally more efficient in its use of spectrum than analog FM radio, and thus can offer more radio services for the same given bandwidth. The broadcaster can select any desired sound quality, from high-fidelity signals for music to low-fidelity signals for talk radio, in which case the sound quality can be noticeably inferior to analog FM. High-fidelity equates to a high bit rate and higher transmission cost. DAB is more robust with regard to noise and multipath fading for mobile listening, although DAB reception quality degrades rapidly when the signal strength falls below a critical threshold (as is normal for digital broadcasts), whereas FM reception quality degrades slowly with the decreasing signal, providing more effective coverage over a larger area. DAB+ is a "green" platform and can bring up to 85 percent energy consumption savings compared to FM broadcasting (but analog tuners are more efficient than digital ones, and DRM+ has been recommended for small scale transmissions).

Similar terrestrial digital radio standards are HD Radio, ISDB-Tb, DRM, and the related DMB. Also 5G Broadcast is developing globally for radio and television broadcasting. This system has the potential to enable digital terrestrial radio reception also in smartphones.

== History and development ==
=== Eureka-147 project ===
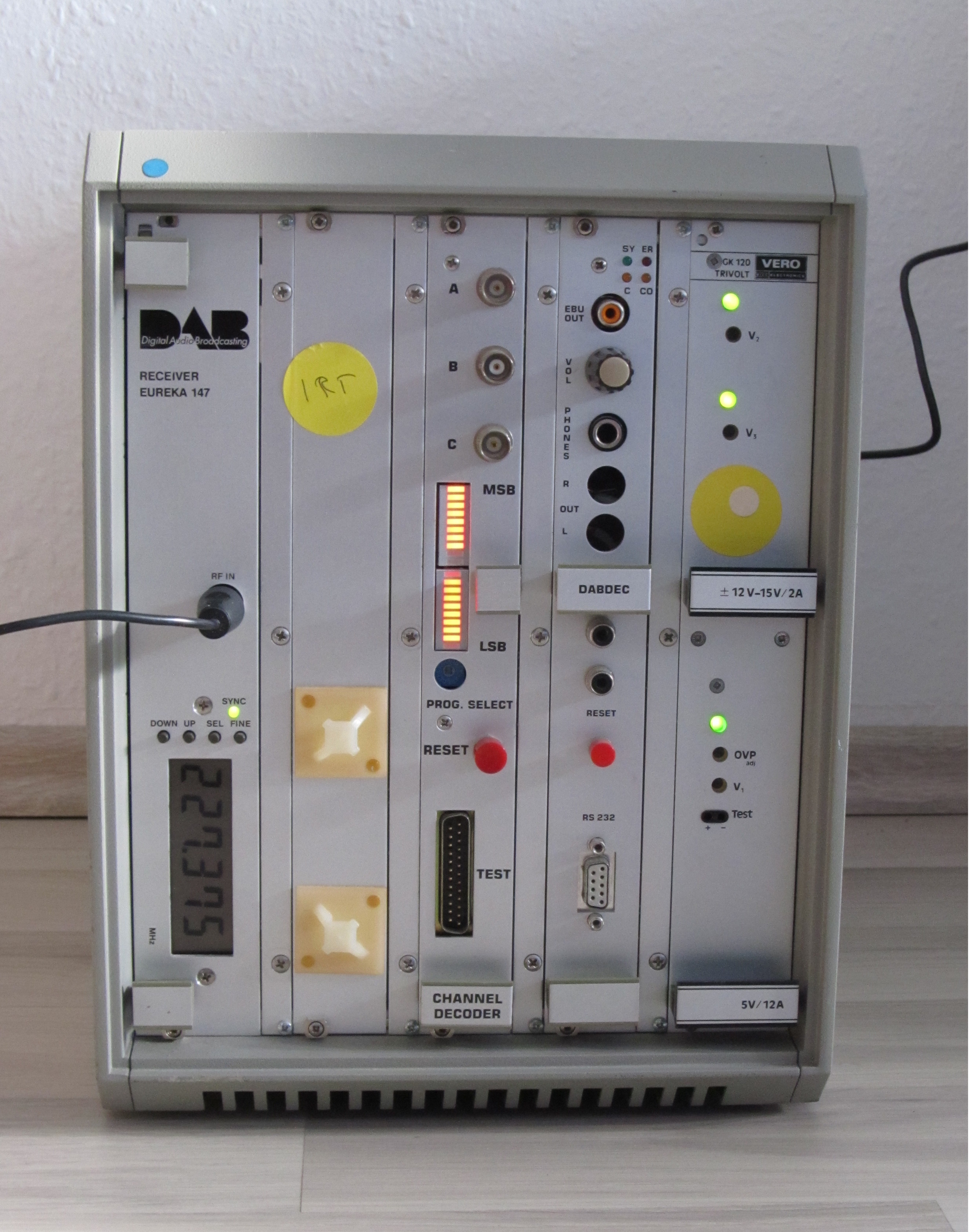
Prototype DAB receiver (1993)

The DAB standard was initiated as a European research project. It began in the 1980s with the collaboration of the West German Institut für Rundfunktechnik (IRT) in and the French Centre commun d'études de télévision et télécommunications (CCETT). The consortium formed in 1986 and numerous other European broadcasting organisations such as the BBC had also joined. It eventually became a project of Eureka and was named the Eureka-147 DAB Project in 1987, with the stated goal of developing a system that "would produce improved reception compared to FM...and with the potential to offer additional services such as text and other data, conditional access, enhanced traffic services, and picture transmission". Efficient bandwidth, low transmitting power, good reception in cars and audio quality comparable to CD, were some of the other goals.

The first DAB demonstrations were held in 1988 in Geneva during WARC-88 conference, after which numerous other trials took place throughout several other countries in Europe. There was also a demonstration at the 1991 NAB Show in the USA. The MPEG-1 Audio Layer II ("MP2") codec was created as part of this project. DAB was the first standard based on orthogonal frequency-division multiplexing (OFDM) modulation technique, which since then has become one of the most popular transmission schemes for modern wideband digital communication systems.

A choice of audio codec, modulation and error-correction coding schemes and first trial broadcasts were made in 1990. A significant decision was the assigning of frequencies on the radio spectrum, as it was decided to operate the system on different bands (Band I, Band III and L Band) compared to those used on FM and AM. The protocol specification was finalized in 1992 or 1993 and adopted by the ITU-R standardization body in 1994, the European community in 1995 and by ETSI in 1997. The European DAB Forum (now WorldDAB) was formed in 1995, and the Eureka-147 project itself had "ended" and merged into WorldDAB in 1999.

=== Launch and early adoption ===
Pilot broadcasts were launched in 1995: the Norwegian Broadcasting Corporation (NRK) launched the first DAB channel in the world on 1 June 1995 (NRK Klassisk), and the BBC and Swedish Radio (SR) launched their first broadcasts later in September in the UK and Sweden respectively while in Germany a pilot broadcast started in Bavaria in October 1995. Commercial stations in the UK started broadcasting in November 1999 as Digital One.

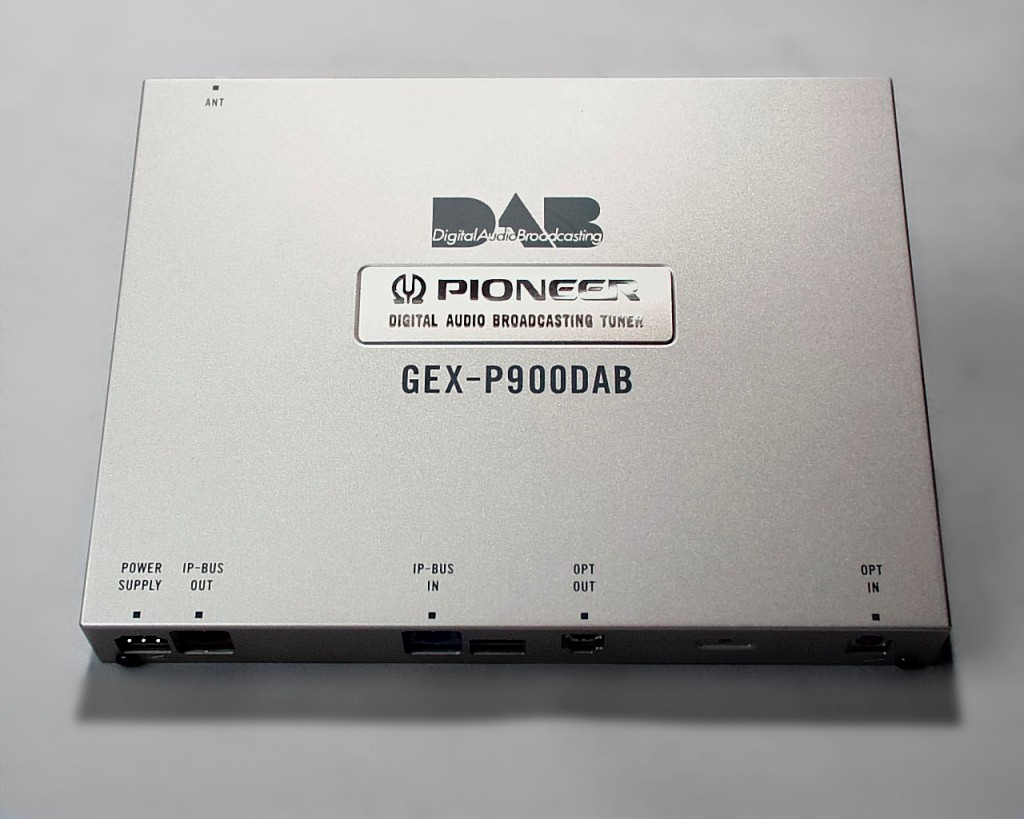
A Pioneer car DAB tuner from 1998. This box connects to its head unit on the car dashboard as well as an external aerial.

The earliest DAB receivers in 1995 were semi-professional units for cars with separate boxes fitted in the boot. They were manufactured by Alpine, Bosch, Grundig, Kenwood, Philips and Sony, designed for evaluation purposes. These were complex systems based on either a DAB channel-decoder chipset from the JESSI (Joint European Sub-micron Silicon Initiative) project, or on general-purpose DSPs. Prototype consumer grade DAB receivers with improved silicons were first shown in 1997, but manufacturers were reluctant to release receivers in Europe partly due to the delay of DAB's launch in Germany. By 1999, most DAB receivers remained expensive car-based black box units and a handful of Hi-Fi home tuners.

It took some more time until further advancements in the integrated circuits helped to make DAB more accessible: notably Texas Instruments's DRE200 chip, released in 2001, significantly reduced the cost and size of the boards. This chip finally made portable DAB radios possible, and the first working prototype of a pocket DAB radio was presented by Roke Manor Research, part of Siemens, using a module named GoldCard II designed with Panasonic. Eventually the rise of affordable home DAB receivers, notably beginning with the Pure Evoke in 2002 (which used an IC made by Frontier Silicon, a company that would power many DAB tuners in the future), helped to take off DAB to consumers for the first time.

However, adoption remained generally slow for various reasons such as high receiver costs and limited reception, with the exception of the United Kingdom and Denmark. In the UK, DAB radio receivers were high selling and 10% of households owned a DAB radio as of 2005, partly due to local manufacturers creating affordable receivers. In many other countries, such as Germany, Finland, and Sweden, DAB was unable to take off. By 2006, 500 million people worldwide were in the coverage area of DAB broadcasts. In 2006 there were approximately 1,000 DAB channels in operation worldwide.

=== Creation of DAB+ ===
Old DAB+ logo

The World DMB Forum (now WorldDAB) instructed its Technical Committee to work on an improved digital radio system. This work led to the creation of DAB+ in 2006. This new standard is based on DAB but uses newer MPEG-4 compression instead of MPEG-2, making it far more efficient and allowing more services to be broadcast without a loss in audio quality.

The HE-AAC v2 audio codec (also known as eAAC+) was adopted for DAB+. AAC+ uses a modified discrete cosine transform (MDCT) algorithm. It has also adopted the MPEG Surround audio format and stronger error correction coding in the form of Reed–Solomon coding. DAB+ has been standardised as European Telecommunications Standards Institute (ETSI) TS 102 563.

As DAB is not forward compatible with DAB+, older DAB receivers cannot receive DAB+ broadcasts. However, DAB receivers that were capable of receiving the new DAB+ standard after a firmware upgrade were being sold as early as July 2007. Malta was the first country to launch DAB+ broadcasts in Europe in October 2008 and DAB+ broadcasts have since been trialled or launched in more countries. If DAB+ stations launch in established DAB countries, they can transmit alongside existing DAB stations that use the older MPEG-1 Audio Layer II audio format, and most existing DAB stations are expected to continue broadcasting until the vast majority of receivers support DAB+.

=== Growth in 2010s ===
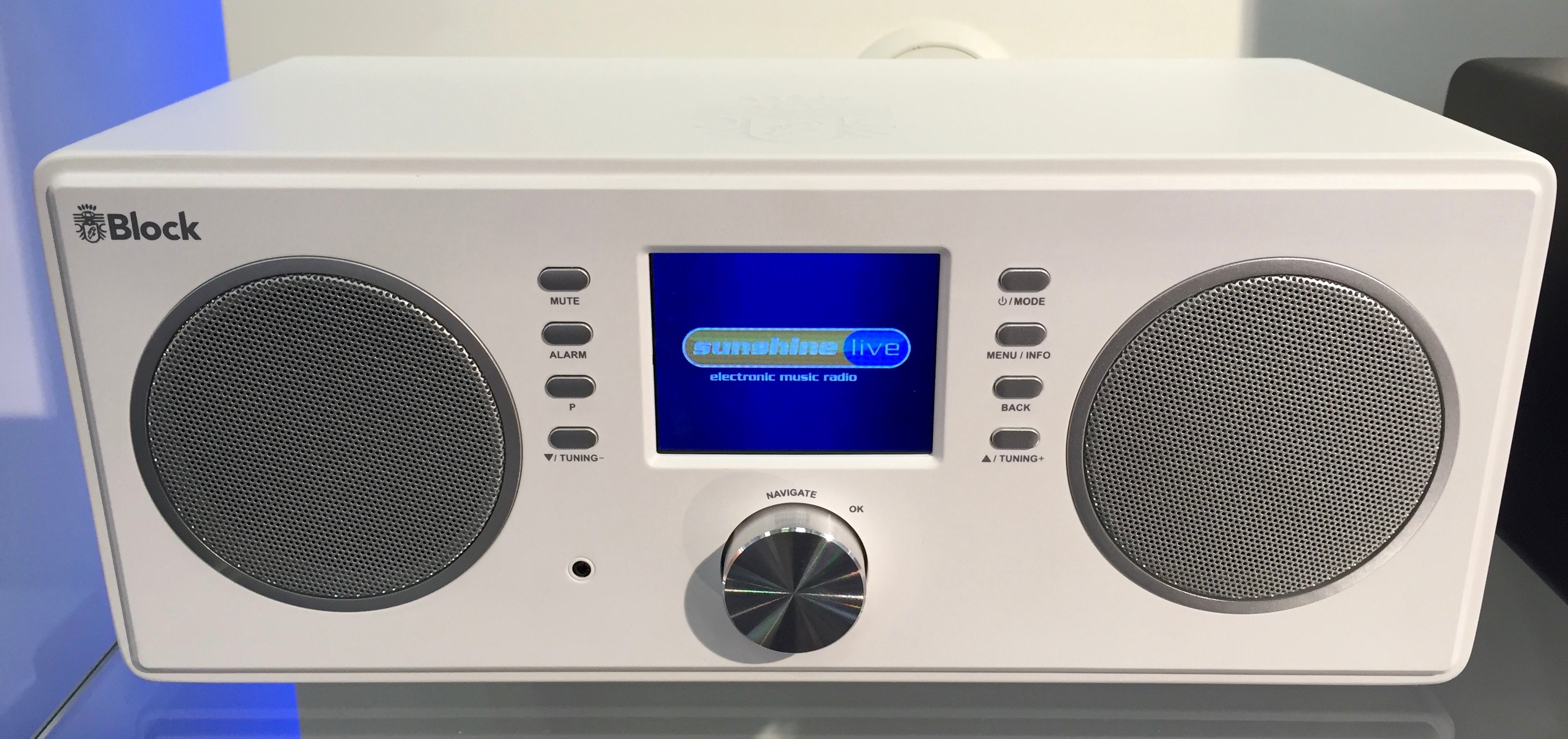
A modern large tabletop DAB receiver with colour screen

In such countries where DAB was unsuccessful, efforts were made in later years to "re-launch" it using the newer DAB+ standard. it started gaining traction throughout the 2010s and finally took off in countries like France by 2019. DAB+ had launched broadcasts in various countries such as Australia, Czech Republic, Denmark, Germany, Hong Kong (now terminated), Italy, Norway, Poland, Switzerland, Belgium, the United Kingdom and the Netherlands. Its UK launch occurred in January 2016 and the new national network Sound Digital launched with three DAB+ stations. A number of stations, such as Classic FM, have since switched from DAB to DAB+.

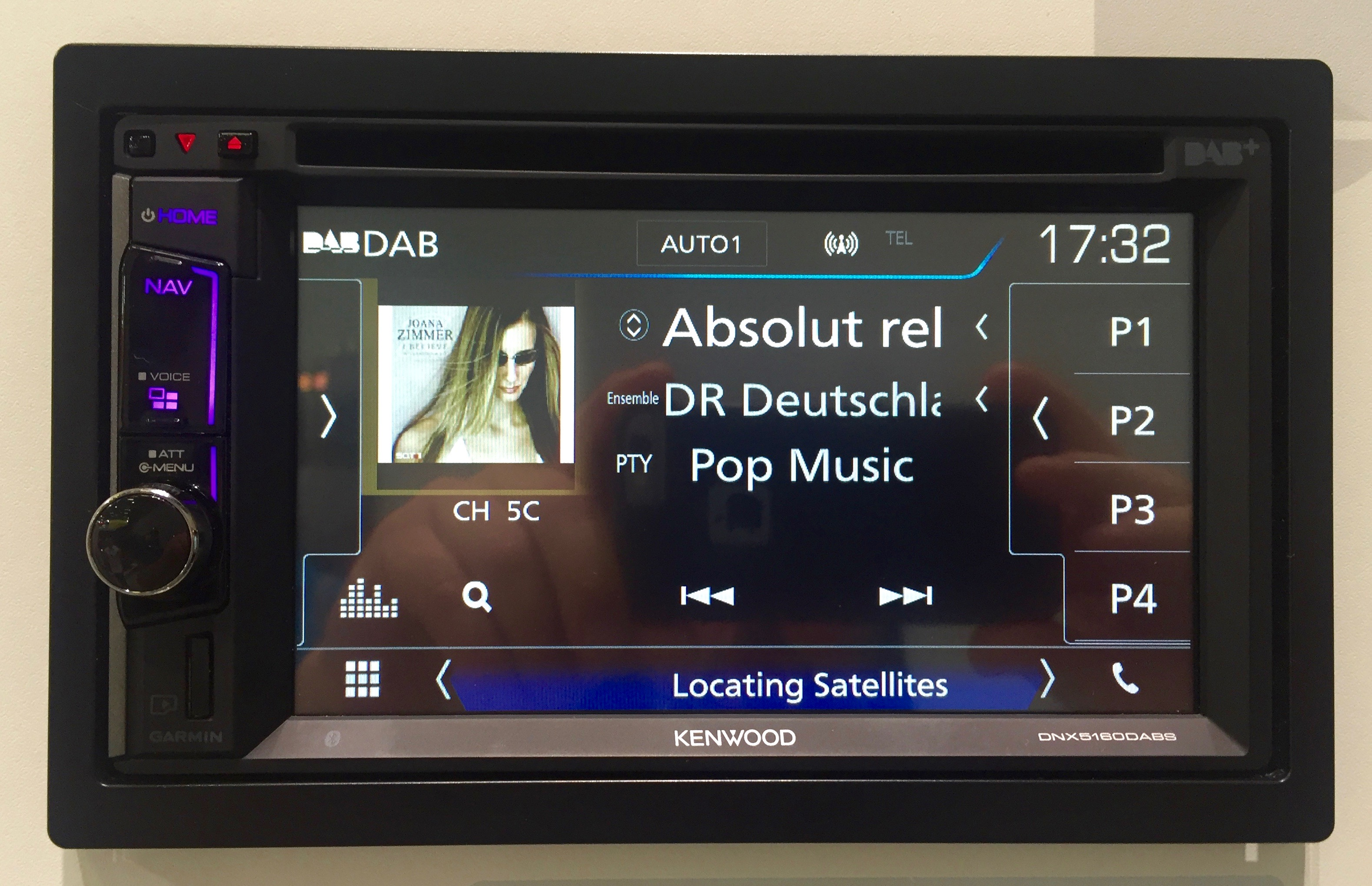
A 2 DIN Kenwood car stereo receiving a DAB+ broadcast

DAB adoption in automobiles became increasingly common during this time, and by 2016 it was standard in most cars sold in the UK, Norway and Switzerland. Since 2021, terrestrial digital radio has been compulsory on cars (not busses and trucks) sold in the European Union (EU) as well as Saudi Arabia.

As of 2018, over 68 million devices have been sold worldwide, and over 2,270 DAB services are on air. Malta, Monaco and Kuwait achieved 100% coverage of DAB in 2018.

== DMB and DAB-IP ==
Digital multimedia broadcasting (DMB) and DAB-IP are related standards that were developed for mobile radio and TV, they support MPEG 4 AVC and WMV9 respectively as video codecs. However, a DMB video subchannel can easily be added to any DAB transmission, as it was designed to be carried on a DAB subchannel. DMB broadcasts in South Korea carry conventional MPEG 1 Layer II DAB audio services alongside their DMB video services. As of 2017, DMB is currently broadcast in Norway, South Korea, and Thailand. Trials for DAB-IP were held in London in 2006, as "BT Movio". It competed with DVB-H and MediaFLO which were also under testing.

== Countries using DAB ==
Countries with regular services Countries with trials and/or regulation Countries with interest DAB no longer used/switched to another standard

Fifty-five countries provide regular or trial DAB(+) broadcasts. In spectrum management, the bands that are allocated for public DAB services, are abbreviated with T-DAB.

In the European Union, the European Electronic Communications Code (EECC) entered into force on 20 December 2018, with transposition into national legislation by Member States required by 21 December 2020. The Directive applies to all EU member states regardless of the status of DAB+ in each country. This means that since the end of 2020, across all EU countries, all radios in new cars must be capable of receiving and reproducing digital terrestrial radio." Following this directive, Belgium stopped all local sales of domestic analogue radio receivers from 1 January 2023 unless they also received DAB+.

=== FM to DAB(+) radio transition ===
==== Norway ====
Norway was the first country to announce a complete switch-off of national FM radio stations. The switch-off started on 11 January 2017 and ended on 13 December 2017. The 2017 switch-off did not affect most local radio stations including community radio. They can continue to transmit on FM at least until 2031.

==== Switzerland ====
In 2022, the Swiss government decided on a general FM switchoff: all FM broadcasters in the country were to shut down or convert to DAB+ by 31 December 2024, a deadline which was later extended to the end of 2026.

However, SRG SSR, Switzerland's public-service broadcaster, shut down its FM transmission infrastructure early on the original date. The corporation concluded that maintaining FM broadcasts along with DAB+ and Internet streaming was no longer cost-effective, as it claimed that due to widespread adoption of DAB+ the share of the public relying exclusively on FM was under ten percent and decreasing. After the switch-off, ratings researchers found instead that the SRG SSR stations that had been available on FM lost between 20 and 30 per cent of their audiences in most cases.

In December 2025, the Swiss parliament decided to indefinitely postpone the full switch-off of FM owing to concerns from private broadcasters. SRG SSR plans to restart FM broadcasts in the fall of 2026.

==== Other countries ====
- Malta was the first European country to roll out a DAB+ network and services have been on-air since 2008. It covers 100% of the population.
- In Italy, Rai Radio is proposing the country to begin switching off FM transmitters starting in 2025 with the goal of being all digital and shuttering FM broadcasting entirely in 2030. In the northern region of Italy's South Tyrol – Alto Adige, the broadcaster RAS has started switching FM services off.
- The government of Denmark has proposed a closure of FM broadcasting two years after more than half of radio listening is digital.
- In Sweden, "the regulator MPRT has been commissioned by the Swedish government to review the conditions for commercial radio in the longer term (Ku 2021/01993). In dialogue with relevant actors, including the industry, the authority plans to analyse the need for any changes in the regulations for licensing with the aim of submitting a final report to the Ministry of Culture by December 2022." As of August 2023, DAB signals are only broadcast in the greater Stockholm-Uppsala region, Gothenburg, Malmö, Luleå, and Piteå, with no known plans from any of the 3 broadcast licence companies to extend coverage to other regions. Parts of Helsingborg receives signals from Denmark, while Strömstad receives signals from Norway.
- In the United Kingdom, the government agreed with the Digital Radio and Audio Review's main conclusion that there should be no formal switch-off of analogue radio services before 2030 at the earliest, and said that the ongoing decline of analogue listening makes it appropriate to consider updating elements of the legislative framework to support a smooth transition of services away from analogue in due course. The government also agreed this should be looked at again by government and industry in 2026.
- In Poland, following consultations the KRRiT has adopted a position on the end of analogue radio broadcasting "no earlier than 31 December 2026 and no later than 31 December 2030".
- In the Netherlands, the expectations are about official switch off of FM radio between 2027 and 2032.
- Belgium has also expressed readiness to switch to DAB broadcasting: "Flemish Minister of Media Benjamin Dalle expects that the final shutdown of the FM frequencies, the so-called 'switch off', will take place between 2028 and 2031. According to him, the VRT must be a forerunner in the digitisation of the radio landscape. For example, if the 'switch off' does not come on January 1, 2028, it may be an option, according to Dalle, to fully digitise one of the VRT channels."
- Moldova will abandon FM radio and switch to digital radio, according to an announcement made by the Ministry of Infrastructure and Regional Development.
- Germany has not yet reached an agreement for full digital terrestrial radio transition, instead the country intensely invests in DAB+ transmission sites development and simultaneous DAB+/FM broadcasting. Speculations of a possible switch off is in 2033. The national broadcaster Deutschlandradio has already started switching off its FM transmissions in some regions as of July 2024.
- In the Czech Republic, the situation is similar as in Germany: plans are for simultaneous DAB+/FM broadcasting.
- In Estonia, radio stations with Levira's support started testing digital radio frequencies in November 2022. "One of our objectives for the coming year is to create the necessary technical conditions for the development of digital radio," said Oliver Gailan, head of the communications department of the country's consumer protection and technical regulatory authority, the TTJA.
- In Haute-Vienne, a department in the Nouvelle-Aquitaine region in southwest-central France, since 6 December 2022, the Groupement de radios associatives libres en Limousin (Gral), has swapped the traditional FM broadcasting for DAB+.

=== Countries where FM to DAB(+) radio transition is cancelled/postponed ===
Whilst many countries have expected a shift to digital audio broadcasting, a few have moved in the opposite direction following unsuccessful trials.

- Canada conducted trials of DAB in L-band in major cities. However the success of satellite digital radio and lack of L-band DAB receivers led to the analogue switch-off being abandoned. Canada subsequently adopted HD Radio as used in the neighbouring United States instead of DAB.
- Finland abandoned DAB in 2005.
- Hong Kong announced the termination of DAB in March 2017.
- Ireland switched off DAB transmissions in March 2021, having only had one national multiplex operated by the public broadcaster RTÉ Radio since 2017. A survey showed 77% of adults listened to radio via FM, compared with 8% via digital means, of which 0.5% was via DAB. RTÉ's service began in 2006, after trials in 1998 and 2001. A commercial multiplex was trialled in 2007–8 and licensed, including DAB+, from 2010 to 2017, but the licensee did not renew because of lack of takeup by broadcasters. In 2025, Ireland decided to relaunch DAB+ national multiplexes.
- Israel had experimental DAB broadcasts between 1996 and 2008 operated by the telecommunications company Bezeq. An invitation to tender for a permanent national multiplex using DAB+ did not receive any applications.
- Hungary announced the termination of DAB+ on 5 September 2020, 12 years after its start.
- New Zealand started a DAB+ trial with transmitters broadcasting on Band III in Auckland and Wellington in 2006. Uptake for the service was very low, and the trial ended in 2018.
- Portugal announced the termination of DAB in April 2011.
- Romania switched off DAB broadcast in September 2021 due to lack of interest both from broadcasters and listeners, low availability of receivers, low number of listeners and higher acceptance and interest in internet radio and FM.
- South Korea stopped transmission of MBC 11FM in 2015 and the DAB channel was switched to T-DMB V-Radio.
- Sweden The Swedish government postponed the transition to DAB in 2016, following a report from the National Audit Office which criticized the benefits for the listeners compared to continued FM-transmissions paired other digital transmission techniques (4G, Internet) and the strength of FM-radio as a simple and reliable source for emergency/crisis information. Limited transmissions continue in Stockholm, Göteborg, Malmö and Luleå

== Technology ==
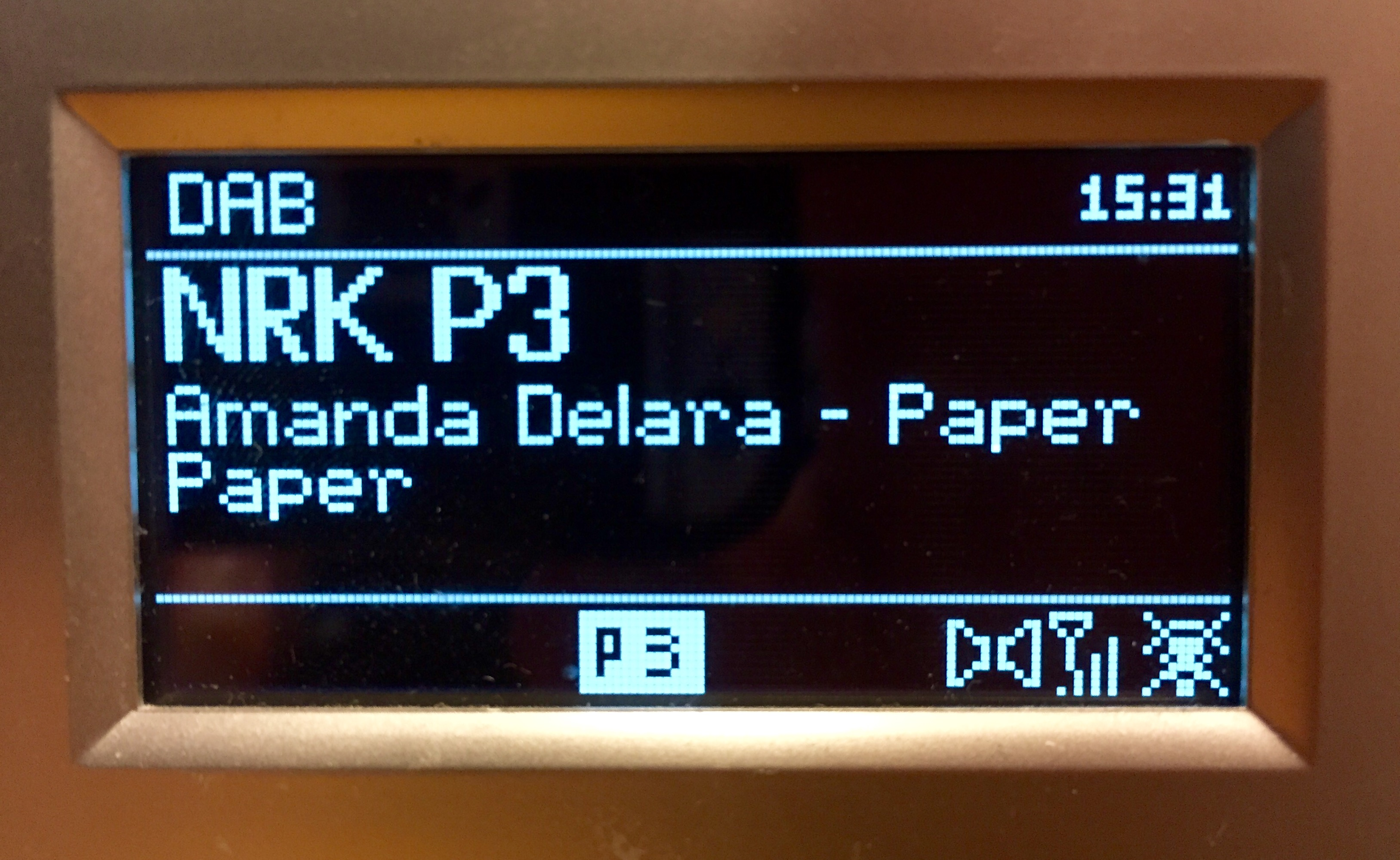
A DAB radio receiver screen displaying the current station name, name of the current playing song, and other information

=== Bands and modes ===
DAB uses a wide-bandwidth broadcast technology and typically spectra have been allocated for it in Band III (174–240 MHz) and L band (1.452–1.492 GHz), although the scheme allows for operation between 30 and 300 MHz. The US military has reserved L-Band in the USA only, blocking its use for other purposes in America, and the United States has reached an agreement with Canada to restrict L-Band DAB to terrestrial broadcast to avoid interference.

Current mode

- Mode I for Band III, Earth

In January 2017, an updated DAB specification (2.1.1) removed Modes II, III and IV, leaving only Mode I.

Former modes

- Mode II for L-Band, Earth and satellite
- Mode III for frequencies below 3 GHz, Earth and satellite
- Mode IV for L-Band, Earth and satellite

=== Protocol stack ===
From an OSI model protocol stack viewpoint, the technologies used on DAB inhabit the following layers: the audio codec inhabits the presentation layer. Below that is the data link layer, in charge of statistical time-division multiplexing and frame synchronization. Finally, the physical layer contains the error-correction coding, OFDM modulation, and dealing with the over-the-air transmission and reception of data. Some aspects of these are described below.

==== Audio codec ====
DAB initially only used the MPEG-1 Audio Layer II audio codec, which is often referred to as MP2 because of the ubiquitous MP3 (MPEG-1 Audio Layer III).

The newer DAB+ standard adopted the LC-AAC and HE-AAC, including its version 2 audio codecs, commonly known as AAC, AAC+ or aacPlus. AAC+ uses a modified discrete cosine transform (MDCT) algorithm, and is approximately three times more efficient than MP2, which means that broadcasters using DAB+ are able to provide far higher audio quality or far more stations than they could with DAB, or a combination of both higher audio quality and more stations.

One of the most important decisions regarding the design of a digital radio broadcasting system is the choice of which audio codec to use because the efficiency of the audio codec determines how many radio stations can be carried on a fixed capacity multiplex at a given level of audio quality.

==== Error-correction coding ====
Error-correction coding (ECC) is an important technology for a digital communication system because it determines how robust the reception will be for a given signal strength – stronger ECC will provide a more robust reception than a weaker form.

The old version of DAB uses punctured convolutional coding for its ECC. The coding scheme uses unequal error protection (UEP), which means that parts of the audio bit-stream that are more susceptible to errors causing audible disturbances are provided with more protection (i.e. a lower code rate) and vice versa. However, the UEP scheme used on DAB results in a grey area in between the user experiencing good reception quality and no reception at all, as opposed to the situation with most other wireless digital communication systems that have a sharp "digital cliff", where the signal rapidly becomes unusable if the signal strength drops below a certain threshold. When DAB listeners receive a signal in this intermediate strength area they experience a "burbling" sound which interrupts the playback of the audio.

The DAB+ standard incorporates Reed–Solomon ECC as an "inner layer" of coding that is placed around the byte interleaved audio frame but inside the "outer layer" of convolutional coding used by the original DAB system, although on DAB+ the convolutional coding uses equal error protection (EEP) rather than UEP since each bit is equally important in DAB+. This combination of Reed–Solomon coding as the inner layer of coding, followed by an outer layer of convolutional coding – so-called "concatenated coding" – became a popular ECC scheme in the 1990s, and NASA adopted it for its deep-space missions. One slight difference between the concatenated coding used by the DAB+ system and that used on most other systems is that it uses a rectangular byte interleaver rather than Forney interleaving in order to provide a greater interleaver depth, which increases the distance over which error bursts will be spread out in the bit-stream, which in turn will allow the Reed–Solomon error decoder to correct a higher proportion of errors.

Equal Error Protection
Profile	Code rate
EEP-1A	2/8 (1/4)
EEP-2A	3/8
EEP-3A	4/8 (1/2)
EEP-4A	6/8 (3/4)
EEP-1B	4/9
EEP-2B	4/7
EEP-3B	4/6 (2/3)
EEP-4B	4/5

The ECC used on DAB+ is far stronger than is used on DAB, which, with all else being equal (i.e., if the transmission powers remained the same), would translate into people who currently experience reception difficulties on DAB receiving a much more robust signal with DAB+ transmissions. It also has a far steeper "digital cliff", and listening tests have shown that people prefer this when the signal strength is low compared to the shallower digital cliff on DAB.

==== Modulation ====
Immunity to fading and inter-symbol interference (caused by multipath propagation) is achieved without equalization by means of the OFDM and DQPSK modulation techniques. For details, see the OFDM system comparison table.

Using values for Transmission Mode I (TM I), the OFDM modulation consists of 1,536 subcarriers that are transmitted in parallel. The useful part of the OFDM symbol period is 1.0 ms, which results in the OFDM subcarriers each having a bandwidth of 1 kHz due to the inverse relationship between these two parameters, and the overall OFDM channel bandwidth is 1.537 MHz. The OFDM guard interval for TM I is 0.246 ms, which means that the overall OFDM symbol duration is 1.246 ms. The guard interval duration also determines the maximum separation between transmitters that are part of the same single-frequency network (SFN), which is approximately 74 km for TM I.

==== Single-frequency networks ====
OFDM allows the use of single-frequency networks (SFN), which means that a network of transmitters can provide coverage to a large area – up to the size of a country – where all transmitters use the same transmission frequency block. Transmitters that are part of an SFN need to be very accurately synchronised with other transmitters in the network, which requires the transmitters to use very accurate clocks.

When a receiver receives a signal that has been transmitted from the different transmitters that are part of an SFN, the signals from the different transmitters will typically have different delays, but to OFDM they will appear to simply be different multipaths of the same signal. Reception difficulties can arise, however, when the relative delay of multipaths exceeds the OFDM guard interval duration, and there are frequent reports of reception difficulties due to this issue when propagation conditions change, such as when there's high pressure, as signals travel farther than usual, and thus the signals are likely to arrive with a relative delay that is greater than the OFDM guard interval.

Low power gap-filler transmitters can be added to an SFN as and when desired in order to improve reception quality, although the way SFNs have been implemented in the UK up to now they have tended to consist of higher power transmitters being installed at main transmitter sites in order to keep costs down.

==== Bit rates ====
An ensemble has a maximum bit rate that can be carried, but this depends on which error protection level is used. However, all DAB multiplexes can carry a total of 864 "capacity units". The number of capacity units, or CU, that a certain bit-rate level requires depends on the amount of error correction added to the transmission, as described above. In the UK, most services transmit using 'protection level three', which provides an average ECC code rate of approximately 1/2, equating to a maximum bit rate per multiplex of 1,184 kbit/s.

=== Services and ensembles ===
Various different services are embedded into one ensemble (which is also typically called a multiplex). These services can include:

- Primary services, like main radio stations
- Secondary services, like additional sports commentaries
- Data services
  - Electronic Programme Guide (EPG)
  - Collections of HTML pages and digital images (known as 'broadcast websites')
  - Slideshows, which may be synchronised with audio broadcasts. For example, a police appeal could be broadcast with the e-fit of a suspect or CCTV footage.
  - Video
  - Java platform applications
  - IP tunnelling
  - Other raw data

== DAB and AM/FM compared ==
Traditionally, radio programmes were broadcast on different frequencies via AM and FM, and the radio had to be tuned into each frequency as needed. This used up a comparatively large amount of spectrum for a relatively small number of stations, limiting listening choice. DAB is a digital radio broadcasting system that, through the application of multiplexing and compression, combines multiple audio streams onto a relatively narrow band centred on a single broadcast frequency called a DAB ensemble.

Within an overall target bit rate for the DAB ensemble, individual stations can be allocated different bit rates. The number of channels within a DAB ensemble can be increased by lowering average bit rates, but at the expense of the quality of streams. Error correction under the DAB standard makes the signal more robust but reduces the total bit rate available for streams.

=== FM HD Radio versus DAB ===
DAB broadcasts a single multiplex that is approximately 1.5 MHz wide (≈1,184 kilobits per second). That multiplex is then subdivided into multiple digital streams of between 9 and 12 programs. In contrast, FM HD Radio adds its digital carriers to the traditional 270 kilohertz-wide analog channels, with capability of up to 300 kbit/s per station (pure digital mode). The full bandwidth of the hybrid mode approaches 400 kHz.

The first generation DAB uses the MPEG-1 Audio Layer II (MP2) audio codec, which has less efficient compression than newer codecs. The typical bitrate for DAB stereo programs is only 128 kbit/s or less and as a result most radio stations on DAB have a lower sound quality than FM, prompting complaints from listeners. As with DAB+ or T-DMB in Europe, FM HD Radio uses a codec based upon the MPEG-4 HE-AAC standard.

HD Radio is a proprietary system from iBiquity Digital Corporation, a subsidiary of DTS, Inc. since 2015, which is itself owned by Xperi Corporation since 2016. DAB is an open standard deposited at ETSI.

=== Use of frequency spectrum and transmitter sites ===
DAB can give substantially higher spectral efficiency, measured in programmes per MHz and per transmitter site, than analogue systems. In many places, this has led to an increase in the number of stations available to listeners, especially outside of the major urban areas. However, due to the inefficient MP2 codec this is often at a notable cost to the quality as well as signal robustness (a reduction in error correction is necessary to tackle bandwidth constraints). This is a lesser concern with DAB+ which uses a much more efficient codec (HE-AAC v1 or v2 being the de-facto standard), allowing a lower bitrate per channel with little to no loss in quality while also making stronger error correction more viable. If some stations transmit in mono, their bitrate can be reduced compared to stereo broadcasts, further improving the efficiency.

For example, analog FM requires 0.2 MHz per programme. The frequency reuse factor in most countries is approximately 15 for stereo transmissions (with lesser factors for mono FM networks), meaning (in the case of stereo FM) that only one out of 15 transmitter sites can use the same channel frequency without problems with co-channel interference, i.e. cross-talk. Assuming a total availability of 102 FM channels at a bandwidth of 0.2 MHz over the Band II spectrum of 87.5 to 108.0 MHz, an average of 102/15 = 6.8 radio channels are possible on each transmitter site (plus lower-power local transmitters causing less interference). This results in a system spectral efficiency of 1 / 15 / (0.2 MHz) = 0.30 programmes/transmitter/MHz. DAB with 192 kbit/s codec requires 1.536 MHz * 192 kbit/s / 1,136 kbit/s = 0.26 MHz per audio programme. The frequency reuse factor for local programmes and multi-frequency broadcasting networks (MFN) is typically 4 or 5, resulting in 1 / 4 / (0.26 MHz) = 0.96 programmes/transmitter/MHz. This is 3.2 times as efficient as analog FM for local stations. For single frequency network (SFN) transmission, for example of national programmes, the channel re-use factor is 1, resulting in 1/1/0.25 MHz = 3.85 programmes/transmitter/MHz, which is 12.7 times as efficient as FM for national and regional networks.

Note the above capacity improvement may not always be achieved at the L-band frequencies, since these are more sensitive to obstacles than the VHF band II frequencies, and may cause shadow fading for hilly terrain and for indoor communication. The number of transmitter sites or the transmission power required for full coverage of a country may be rather high at these frequencies, to avoid the system becoming noise limited rather than limited by co-channel interference.

Furthermore, on VHF Band III tropospheric ducting also tends to occur more often compared to the FM band. While this can improve coverage of a given station compared to FM, even with lower ERPs, it also includes a higher risk of interference either from a signal within the same SFN but distance difference outside of the guard interval or from a completely unrelated multiplex.

== Sound quality ==
The original objectives of converting to digital transmission were to enable higher audio fidelity, more stations and more resistance to noise, co-channel interference and multipath than in analogue FM radio. The improved sound quality is achieved by using CRC and FEC technology, which improves the transmission performance of digital signals. However, many countries in implementing DAB on stereo radio stations use compression to such a degree that it produces lower sound quality than that received from FM broadcasts. This is because of the bit rate levels being too low for the MPEG Layer 2 audio codec to provide high fidelity audio quality.

The BBC Research & Development department states that at least 192 kbit/s is necessary for a high fidelity stereo broadcast:

A value of 256 kbit/s has been judged to provide a high quality stereo broadcast signal. However, a small reduction, to 224 kbit/s is often adequate, and in some cases it may be possible to accept a further reduction to 192 kbit/s, especially if redundancy in the stereo signal is exploited by a process of 'joint stereo' encoding (i.e. some sounds appearing at the centre of the stereo image need not be sent twice). At 192 kbit/s, it is relatively easy to hear imperfections in critical audio material.

— BBC R&D White Paper WHP 061 June 2003

When the BBC reduced the bit-rate of transmission of its classical music station Radio 3 from 192 kbit/s to 160 kbit/s in July 2006, the resulting degradation of audio quality prompted a number of complaints to the corporation. The BBC later announced that following this testing of new equipment, it would resume the previous practice of transmitting Radio 3 at 192 kbit/s whenever there were no other demands on bandwidth. (For comparison, BBC Radio 3 and all other BBC radio stations are streamed online using AAC at 320 kbit/s, described as 'HD', on BBC Radio iPlayer after a period when it was available at two different bit rates.)

Despite the above, a survey in 2007 of DAB listeners (including mobile) has shown most find DAB to have equal or better sound quality than FM.

By 2019, some stations had upgraded to DAB+ but rather than improving sound quality, they instead reduced it to 32 kbit/s or 64 kbit/s, often in mono.

== Strengths and weaknesses ==
=== Benefits of DAB ===
==== Improved features for users ====
DAB devices perform band-scans over the entire frequency range, presenting all stations from a single list for the user to select from.

DAB is capable of providing metadata alongside the audio stream. Metadata allows visual information, text and graphics – such as the station name and logo, presenter, song title and album artwork – to be displayed while a station is playing. Radio stations can provide the metadata to augment the listening experience, particularly on car receivers which have large display panels.

DAB can carry "radiotext" (in DAB terminology, Dynamic Label Segment, or DLS) from the station giving real-time information such as song titles, music type and news or traffic updates, of up to 128 characters in length. This is similar to a feature of FM called RDS, which enables a radiotext of up to 64 characters.

The DAB transmission contains a local time of day and so a device may use this to automatically correct its internal clock when travelling between time zones and when changing to or from Daylight Saving.

==== More stations ====
DAB is not more bandwidth efficient than analogue measured in programmes per MHz of a specific transmitter (the so-called link spectral efficiency), but it is less susceptible to co-channel interference (cross talk), which makes it possible to reduce the reuse distance, i.e. use the same radio frequency channel more densely. The system spectral efficiency (the average number of radio programmes per MHz and transmitter) is a factor three more efficient than analogue FM for local radio stations. For national and regional radio networks, the efficiency is improved by more than an order of magnitude due to the use of SFNs. In that case, adjacent transmitters use the same frequency.

In certain areas – particularly rural areas – the introduction of DAB gives radio listeners a greater choice of radio stations. For instance, in Southern Norway, radio listeners experienced an increase in available stations from 6 to 21 when DAB was introduced in November 2006.

==== Reception quality ====
The DAB standard integrates features to reduce the negative consequences of multipath fading and signal noise, which afflict existing analogue systems.

Also, as DAB transmits digital audio, there is no hiss with a weak signal, which can happen on FM. However, radios in the fringe of a DAB signal can experience a "bubbling mud" sound interrupting the audio or the audio cutting out altogether.

Due to sensitivity to Doppler shift in combination with multipath propagation, DAB reception range (but not audio quality) is reduced when travelling speeds of more than 120 to 200 km/h, depending on carrier frequency.

==== Variable bandwidth ====
Mono talk radio, news and weather channels and other non-music programs need significantly less bandwidth than a typical music radio station, which allows DAB to carry these programmes at lower bit rates, leaving more bandwidth to be used for other programs.

However, this led to the situation where some stations are being broadcast in mono; see § Audio quality for more details.

==== Transmission costs ====
DAB transmitters are inevitably more expensive than their FM counterparts. DAB uses higher frequencies than FM and therefore there may be a need to compensate with more transmitters to achieve the same coverage as a single FM transmitter. DAB is commonly transmitted by a different company from the broadcaster who then sells the capacity to a number of radio stations. This shared cost can work out cheaper than operating an individual FM transmitter.

This efficiency originates from the ability a DAB network has in broadcasting more channels per transmitter/network. One network can broadcast 6–10 channels (with MP2 audio codec) or 10–18 channels (with HE AAC codec). Hence, it is thought that the replacement of FM-radios and FM-transmitters with new DAB-radios and DAB-transmitters will not cost any more compared with new FM facilities. It is also argued that the power consumption will be lower for stations transmitted on a single DAB multiplex compared with individual analog transmitters.

Once applied, one operator has claimed that DAB transmission is as low as one-nineteenth of the cost of FM transmission.

=== Disadvantages of DAB ===
==== Reception quality ====
The reception quality during the early stage of deployment of DAB was poor even for people who live well within the coverage area. The reason for this is that DAB uses weak error correction coding, so that when there are a lot of errors with the received data not enough of the errors can be corrected and a "bubbling mud" sound occurs. In some cases a complete loss of signal can happen. This situation has been improved upon in the newer DAB+ version that uses stronger error correction coding and as additional transmitters are built.

As with other digital systems, when the signal is weak or suffers severe interference, it will not work at all. DAB reception may also be a problem for receivers when the wanted signal is adjacent to a stronger one. This was a particular issue for early and low cost receivers.

==== Audio quality ====
Up to the mid-2010s, a common complaint by listeners is that broadcasters 'squeeze in' more stations per ensemble than recommended by:

- Minimizing the bit-rate, to the lowest level of sound-quality that listeners are willing to tolerate, such as 112 kbit/s for stereo and even 48 kbit/s for mono speech radio (LBC 1152 and the Voice of Russia are examples).
- Having few digital channels broadcasting in stereo.

==== Signal delay ====
The nature of a single-frequency network (SFN) is such that the transmitters in a network must broadcast the same signal at the same time. To achieve synchronization, the broadcaster must counter any differences in propagation time incurred by the different methods and distances involved in carrying the signal from the multiplexer to the different transmitters. This is done by applying a delay to the incoming signal at the transmitter based on a timestamp generated at the multiplexer, created taking into account the maximum likely propagation time, with a generous added margin for safety. Delays in the audio encoder and the receiver due to digital processing (e.g. deinterleaving) add to the overall delay perceived by the listener. The signal is delayed, usually by around 1 to 4 seconds and can be considerably longer for DAB+. This has disadvantages:

- DAB radios are out of step with live events, so the experience of listening to live commentaries on events being watched is impaired;
- Listeners using a combination of analogue (AM or FM) and DAB radios (e.g. in different rooms of a house) will hear a mixture when both receivers are within earshot.
- Audio based time signals, such as the BBC transmitting the pips, will be delayed and thus inaccurate.

System Time signals, such as those used for built in clocks in the receiver, are not a problem in a network with a fixed delay as the DAB multiplexer adds an offset to the distributed time information. The time information is independent from the audio decoding delay in receivers as the system time is not embedded inside audio frames.

==== Transmission costs ====
DAB can provide savings for networks of several stations. The original development of DAB was driven by national network operators with a number of channels to transmit from multiple sites. However, for individual stations such as small community or local stations which traditionally operate their own FM transmitter on their own building the cost of DAB transmission will be much higher than analog. Operating a DAB transmitter for a single station is not an efficient use of spectrum or power. With that said, this can be solved to some degree by combining multiple local stations in one DAB/DAB+ mux, similar to what is done on DVB-T/DVB-T2 with local TV stations.

==== Coverage ====
Household receiver penetration rates. As of 2021:

Country	Penetration (% of households)
Norway	71
Australia	68.5
United Kingdom	65
Germany	34
Denmark	31
Belgium	21
France	14
Italy	13

Although FM coverage still exceeds DAB coverage in most countries implementing any kind of DAB services, a number of countries moving to digital switchover have undergone significant DAB network rollouts; as of 2022, the following coverages were given by WorldDAB:

Country	Coverage (% of population)
Kuwait	100
Malta	100
Monaco	100
Denmark	99.9
Norway	99.7
Switzerland	99.5
Germany	98
United Kingdom	97.3
Belgium	97
Czech Republic	95
Netherlands	95
Gibraltar	90
South Korea	90
Qatar	90
Croatia	90
Italy	86
Slovenia	85
Austria	83
Serbia	78
Tunisia	75
Poland	67
Australia	66
Estonia	50
Slovakia	46
Sweden	43
France	42
Azerbaijan	33
Turkey	30
Montenegro	29
Spain	20
Thailand	17
Algeria	8
Ukraine	7
Greece	?
Indonesia	?

==== Compatibility ====
In 2006 tests began using the much improved HE-AAC codec for DAB+. Hardly any of the receivers made before 2008 support the newer codec, however, making them partially obsolete once DAB+ broadcasts begin and completely obsolete once all MP2 encoded stations are gone. Most new receivers are both DAB and DAB+ compatible; however, the issue is exacerbated by some manufacturers disabling the DAB+ features on otherwise compatible radios to save on licensing fees when sold in countries without current DAB+ broadcasts.

==== Power requirements ====
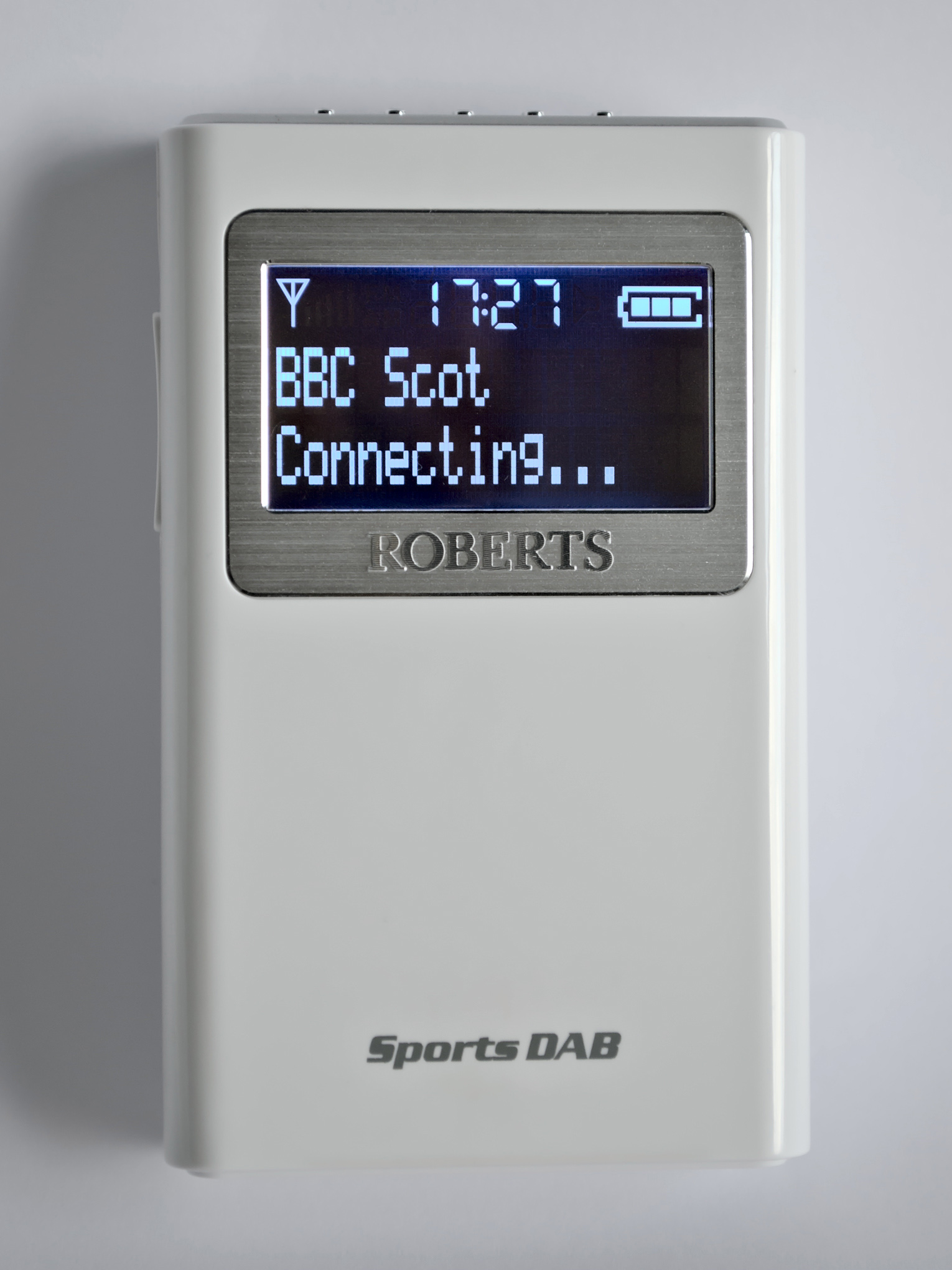
Portable DAB/DAB+ and FM receiver, circa 2016. This unit requires two "AA" size batteries (headphones not shown).

As DAB requires digital signal processing techniques to convert from the received digitally encoded signal to the analogue audio content, the complexity of the electronic circuitry required to do this is higher. This translates into needing more power to effect this conversion than compared to an analogue FM to audio conversion, meaning that portable receiving equipment will have a much shorter battery life, and require higher power (and hence more bulk). This means that they use more energy than analogue Band II VHF receivers. However, thanks to increased integration (radio-on-chip), DAB receiver power usage has been reduced, making portable receivers more usable.

== See also ==
- Digital audio radio service
- Digital multimedia broadcasting (DMB)
- Digital Radio Mondiale (DRM)
- DVB-T2 Lite
- ETSI Satellite Digital Radio (SDR)
- FMeXtra
- HD Radio
- Internet radio device
- ISDB
- Satellite radio
- SHF
- SiriusXM satellite radio
- Spectral efficiency: comparison table
- Ultra high frequency (UHF)
- Very high frequency (VHF)
