= Grace Digital =

Consumer electronics company

Grace Digital Inc is a consumer electronics company based in San Diego, with research and development locations in Cambridge, England; Taipei, Taiwan; and Seoul, Korea. It was founded in 2007 by James D. Palmer and Greg Fadul. The company’s main products are internet based radio receivers, audio archiving equipment, wireless speaker systems, and waterproof personal audio devices and gadgets, which have been given CES Innovations Awards.

== Brand names ==
Grace Digital products are sold under the "Grace Digital Audio", "Victoria", and "EcoXgear" brands.

== Consumer products ==
Grace Digital manufactures internet radios, audio archiving devices, weather-resistant outdoor speakers and speakers for personal music devices.

== Business products ==
Grace Digital has adapted its devices to be used in a business environment, primarily for music on hold and overhead in-store music, also known as elevator music.

== See also ==
- Sirius Satellite Radio
- Reciva
- Network Media Player
- Pandora Radio
