= Shield Mark BV vs Joost Kist =

Shield Mark
- European Court of Justice

Submitted July 18 2001 Decided November 27 2003
- Full case name: Shield Mark BV vs. Joost Kist.
- Case: 283/01
- Chamber: 6th
- Nationality of parties: Dutch

Shield Mark B.V. vs. Joost Kist is a decision by the 6th Senate of the European Court of Justice, case C-283/01, which dealt with the question whether sound signs may be registered as trademarks, and what requirements those sound signs and their trademark entry have to fulfill to be consistent with Article 2 of the First Council Directive of 21 December 1988 to approximate the laws of the Member States relating to trade marks (89/104/EEC).

== Sound trademarks ==
=== Definition ===
Sound signs are melodies or tone colors. They are identified by hearing without support through speech. As such they can be utilized in acoustic brand marketing, which creates the need to register them as trademarks to protect a company's intellectual property and ensure their use as exclusive identifier for the company, just like a company logo does. Sound trademarks are protected trademarks centered on the reproduction of sounds and tones. Combinations of sound and word or graphic elements are additional design options. Typical sound marks include tunes, jingles, melodies, as well as general sounds or noise.

In the European Union, a sound sign or tone color can be trade marked as sound trademark if it has significant differentiation and can be graphically represented. These requirements are satisfied if the sound trademark is clear, precise, self-contained, easily accessible, intelligible, durable and objective. Therefore sound signs or tone colors can only be registered in the member states of the European Union if they are precisely graphically represented, e.g. by musical notation or a sonogram, or any other distinct method, e.g. a sound recording.

=== Historical Development ===
Music or tunes have been utilized for centuries to highlight specific events. A church bell drawing attention to an ecclesiastical service is a prime example. The utilization of music for specific product advertisements comparable to today's sound trademarks has been boosted with the introduction of the radio and later the television. First radio advertisements underlined by music were already aired in the 1920s.

=== Significance for Marketing ===
Sound trademarks are underestimated as marketing instrument. Their value of brand recognition makes them an effective enhancement to conventional marketing strategies. Sound trademarks create emotional associations to a specific product when the target customers hear a particular melody or tune.

== Shield Mark Verdict of the European Court of Justice ==
The following paragraph introduces the verdict in the legal case Shield Mark BV versus Joost Kist, representative of the company Memex, before the European Court of Justice (ECJ), case number C-283/01.

=== Facts of the Case ===
The Dutch company Shield Mark BV had registered 14 sound trademarks at the Benelux trademark office, the first on 5 June 1992 and the most recent on 2 February 1999, for various services like computer software and seminars in the areas of promotion, marketing, intellectual property and commercial communication. Four of those trademarks consist of a musical stave with the first nine notes of the musical composition "Für Elise" by Ludwig van Beethoven. Two of them have the added remark "sound mark". The trademark entries consist of the representation of the melody formed by the notes (graphically) transcribed on a stave. In one case the remark "played on a piano" was added. Four other trademarks consisted of the first nine notes of "Für Elise". Two of them also had "sound mark" added as annotation. The trademark consists of the melody described, plus, in one case, the remark "played on a piano". Three further marks consist of the sequence of musical notes "E, D#, E, D#, E, B, D, C, A". Two of them also state "sound mark". The trademark consists of the reproduction of the melody formed by the sequence of notes as described, again in one case "played on a piano". A sound trademark consisting of an onomatopoetic word (called "onomatopoeia"), the Dutch "Kukelekuuuuu" crow of a rooster was used for the computer software. Another sound trademark is registered for the first nine notes of Ludwig van Beethoven's composition "Für Elise" used for a jingle in a promotion campaign in October 1992.

The crow of the rooster was used in a Shield Mark software developed for lawyers and trademark specialists to signal the start of the program. Flyers displayed on stands in bookshops and newspaper kiosks played the signature tune each time one was taken from the stand. Shield Mark's competitor, Joost Kist with his company Memex, which also operates in the field of legal advice for communication, started a promotion campaign in January 1995 also using the first nine notes of "Für Elise". Furthermore, Joost Kist also utilized Shield Mark's registered sound of the crow of the rooster at the start of a software he sold. Shield Mark brought an action against Mr. Kist for infringement of its trademarks and unfair competition.

=== From the Dutch Courts to the European Court of Justice ===
By judgment of 27 May 1999, the Gerechtshof te's Gravenhage granted Shield Mark's application, which was based on the law of civil responsibility, but dismissed the claims based on trademark law, on the ground that it was the intention of the Governments of the Benelux states and their joint trademark law to preclude sound signs from being registered as trademarks.

Thereupon Shield Mark appealed to the Hoge Raad der Nederlanden, the highest civil court of the Netherlands, which decided to stay proceedings and to refer two questions to the European Court of Justice under Article 234 EC for a preliminary ruling on the interpretation of Article 2 of First Council Directive 89/104/EEC of 21 December 1988 to approximate the laws of the Member States relating to trade marks.

=== First Question: Consistency with the EU Directive ===
Part (a) of the first question asked whether Article 2 of the Directive must be interpreted as precluding sound signs from being regarded as trademarks. If the answer was negative, the Hoge Raad asked by part (b) of its first question, whether Article 2 implies that sound signs must be capable of being regarded as trademarks.

The ECJ responded that the purpose of Article 2(a) of the Directive is to define the types of signs of which a trademark may consist. That provision states that a trade mark may consist of "particularly words, including personal names, designs, letters, numerals, the shape of goods or of their packaging ...".

Thus only signs that are capable of being perceived visually are mentioned. That list is not exhaustive, however, as can be seen from the language of both Article 2 of the Directive and the seventh recital in the preamble thereto, which refers to a "list of examples" of signs of which a trade mark may consist. Consequently, that provision, although it does not mention signs that are not in themselves capable of being perceived visually, such as sounds, does not expressly exclude them. Additionally, sound signs are capable of distinguishing the goods and services of one undertaking from those of other undertakings.

Following these arguments, the Court found that according to Article 2 of the Directive sounds may constitute a trademark, on the condition that they may also be represented graphically.

In regard to part (b) of the first question, the Court also stated that Article 2 of the Directive does not preclude the registration of sounds as trade marks. Consequently, the Member States cannot preclude such registration as a matter of principle. Although the Directive does not seek to achieve full-scale approximation of the laws of the Member States relating to trademarks, the conditions for obtaining and continuing to hold a trademark have to be the same.

=== Second Question: Criteria for Registering Sound Trademarks ===
The second submitted question asked (a) which requirements sound signs have to fulfill to meet the criteria of Article 2 of the Directive, and (b) what kinds of sound sign are capable of being represented graphically within the meaning of Article 2, in particular, whether musical notes, a written description in the form of an onomatopoeia, a written description in some other form, a graphical representation such as a sonogram, a sound recording annexed to the registration form, a digital recording accessible via the internet, a combination of those methods, or any other form meet the requirements of graphical representation.

The Court denied a verdict about types of sound signs that weren't decisive for the case at hand, e.g. sonograms and digital recordings, as these were hypothetical problems.

The requirements that have to be met by graphical representations were already determined in the verdict Ralf Sieckmann v Deutsches Patent und Markenamt, which concerned olfactory signs. Thus, within the frame of Article 2 of the Directive, a trademark may consist of a sign that is not in itself capable of being perceived visually, provided that it can be represented graphically, particularly by means of images, lines or characters, and that its representation is clear, precise, self-contained, easily accessible, intelligible, durable and objective. Those conditions are also binding for sound signs.

=== Verdict and Consequences ===
As consequence for the Shield Mark case, the Court ruled that a graphical representation in mere text form such as ‘the first nine notes of "Für Elise" or "the crow of a rooster" at the very least lack precision and clarity and therefore cannot constitute a graphical representation of that sign for the purposes of Article 2 of the Directive. The same applies for onomatopoeia, as it is not possible for the competent authorities and the public, in particular traders, to determine whether the protected sign is the onomatopoeia itself, as pronounced, or the actual sound or noise.

Musical notes, however, in the form of a stave, fulfill the requirements set by the ECJ's Sieckmann verdict that such representation must be clear, precise, self-contained, easily accessible, intelligible, durable and objective. Thus only the sound signs registered by Shield Mark BV along with a stave or other graphic representations meeting the requirements could be upheld as trademarks.
