= Internet radio device =

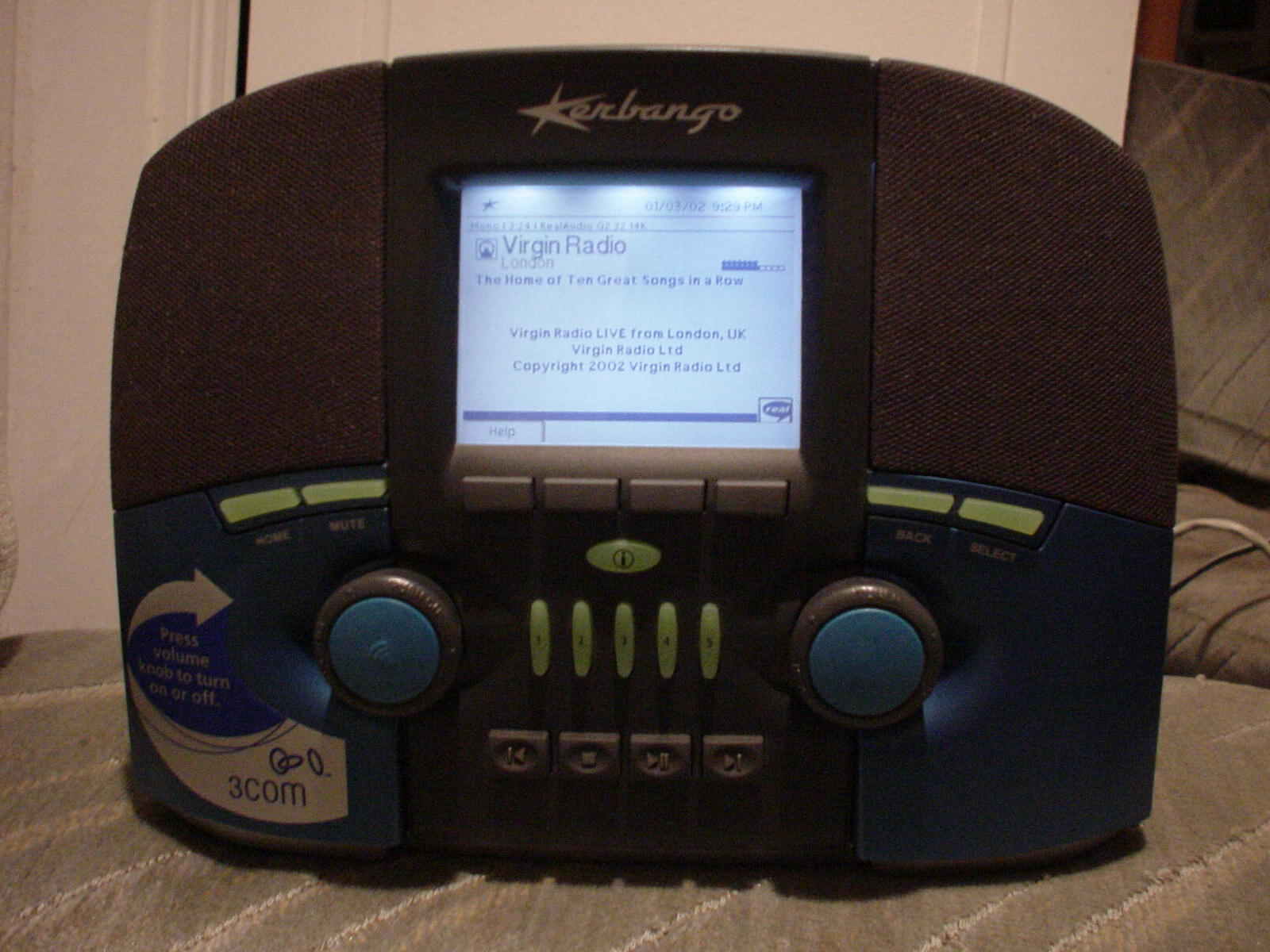
The "Kerbango Internet Radio" was a product, never released, that would allow users to listen to Internet radio without a computer.

An Internet radio device, also called network music player is a hardware device that is capable of receiving and playing streamed media from either Internet radio stations or a home network.

== Background ==
Streaming media became mainstream with the advent of portable music players / MP3 player and the convenience of converting and compressing CD music into music file by the computer or the acquisition of products in such formats using on-line music stores like Amazon, iTunes, and 7digital.

The network music player is connected to a home router. For convenience a wireless router is often used. The router is connected to the internet and thus enables access to Internet streaming resources. Alternatively, the home network can access the user's collection of music on a computer or on a network-attached storage (NAS) device dedicated to store a user's music files.

== Audio streaming ==
Audio streaming is one way of transmitting audio files on a continuous feed to a network music player. A common way today is to stream the audio from the computer to a network music player over the more convenient wireless technologies such as Wi-Fi in a networked environment. The computer, which is typically used for storing the music file, acts as a music server by means of server software, often compliant to DLNA (Digital Living Network Alliance) standard. And the network music player is a typical receiver which starts playing an audio file as soon as some of the data has been received so that one does not have to wait for the entire audio file to finish downloading.

The MP3 music file is streamed to the network music player in digital format, commonly in the original MP3 format. Therefore, the audio details of the MP3 music are sent wirelessly in the home to the network music player as it is stored on the computer and without loss.
The MP3 music files are then converted back into audio signal by the network music player and played. As the MP3 music files are organized by the music server on the computer, the information is also sent to the network music player where the user can see all of the music track information. Many companies working actively in bringing Internet radio into devices are organized in the Internet Media Device Alliance IMDA. In addition to the home networking standards of DLNA, IMDA compatibility standards dedicated to all aspects of Internet radio distribution.

== Internet radio ==
Internet reaches many areas in the world, and thus does Internet radio. It has expanded enormously with an estimated 19,000 stations currently available, including many traditional FM /AM simulcasting their content over the Internet.

== Online music services ==
Online music services offer millions of songs and thousands of artists for users to choose from. Network music players that support online music services let users access a large selection of music tracks.

Station directory services keep a current list of active Internet radio stations, their URI and streaming formats and list them sorted by genre, location, language and other criteria. Many devices use either proprietary vendor-specific station list servers or dedicated directory services.

== Categories ==
There are generally two types of network music players:

- Those without speakers that need to be connected to an audio system in order to listen to the music. Examples of commercial devices are the Philips Streamium NP1100 and NP2500, the Logitech Squeezebox, the Roku SoundBridge (M500, M1000, M2000 and M1001), and the Grace Digital IRDT200.
- Those with their own speakers. Examples of commercial devices are the Connected Flow range of devices from Pure Digital, TerraTec Noxon family, Philips Streamium NP2900 the Logitech Squeezebox Boom, the Roku SoundBridge Radio (R1000), and Grace Digital models IR1000-IR2500. Also many higher-end audio devices such as AVRs and systems from Denon, Pioneer and Onkyo include Internet radio capability.

== Hardware ==
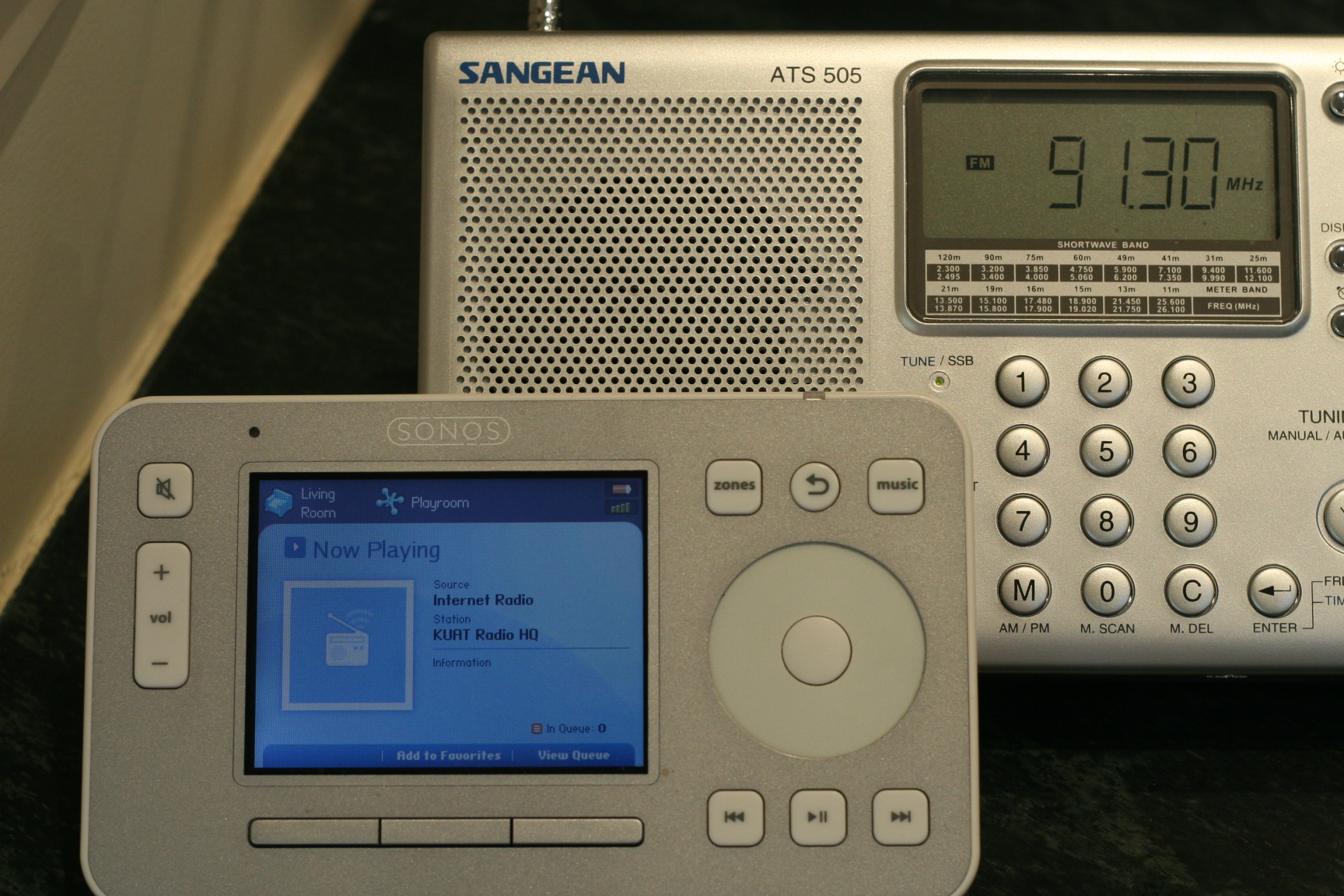
A Sonos controller (bottom left) tuned to an Internet radio station

Network music players usually have:

- Broadband connection: an Ethernet and/or Wi-Fi network interface, with TCP/IP support for access to the Internet
- USB port, where the user can connect an external MP3 player like iPod or external harddrive for MP3 files
- LCD, remote control
- Built-in amplifier/speaker, or AUX-out port, that can be used to connect to a HiFi or similar audio device
- Rechargeable batteries for mobility with internal charger integrated
- Favorite streams & contents can be saved as presets
- Clock with lighted display, some with alarm settings and auto-time-sync

Some devices also have:

- Memory card reader: SD or even SDHC card
- XLR connectors
- (MP3) stream encryption

== See also ==
- FM radio
- Digital Audio Broadcasting (DAB)
- Digital photo frame
- Network Media Player
- Radio receiver
- Smart speaker
