= Hold (telephone) =

Example of a call put on hold in Italy

In telephony, a call may be placed on hold, in which case the connection is not terminated but no verbal communication is possible until the call is removed from hold by the same or another extension on the key telephone system. Music on hold or on hold messaging may be played for the caller while the call is on hold, especially if the call has been placed to a customer service center. Alternatives to placing a caller on hold include virtual hold or virtual queuing solutions that allow scheduled or queue-based callbacks to be made to the caller.
