= Streamium =

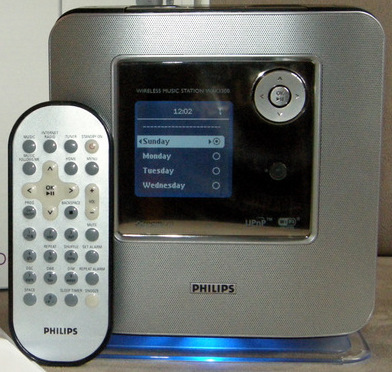
Philips Streamium WAK3300

Streamium was a line of IP-enabled entertainment products by Dutch electronics multi-national Philips Consumer Electronics. Streamium products use Wi-Fi to stream multimedia content from desktop computers or Internet-based services to home entertainment devices. A Streamium device plugged into the local home network will be able to see multimedia files that are in different UPnP-enabled computers, PDAs and other networking devices that run UPnP AV MediaServer software.

Streamium products may also support internet radio, internet photo sharing and movie trailers services directly. Subscriptions to web-based services requiring subscriptions would be managed through the 'Club Philips' portal.

In all cases, using a computer with RSS receiver together with a UPnP AV MediaServer, it is possible to play back audio/video podcast. Some of the popular feeds include BBC live, Geekbrief, Reuters, Metacafe, YouTube. Although in most cases this video podcaster uses codec formats not supported by Streamium, it's still possible by using software codec transcoders on the PC to convert them to MPEG format.

Philips Media Manager, is—since SimpleCenter version 4— a free open source UPnP AV MediaServer for Windows and Macintosh that is bundled with Streamium. Version 3 of SimpleCenter, was initially developed for inclusion with the Streamium line of products. Since Streamium devices also support photos and videos, SimpleCenter ships with video and image support, under the name 'Philips Media Manager' (PMM).

== History ==
In 2000 Philips' consumer electronics division (business unit Audio) invented the Streamium brand for a "Connected Home". A number of products were released between January 2000 and June 2003. In 2003 the "Connected Home" would be broadened to the "Connected Planet" accompanied by an attempt to steer product development and industrialization from Eindhoven and to include other business units. The "Connected Planet" was less successful, leaving a limited number of products.

=== Products ===
The FW-i1000, an audio mini-system including a CD-changer and AM/FM radio, and considered to be the precursor to the Streamium product line, first shipped in June 2001. It had been in development by Philips' audio business group in Sunnyvale (CA, USA) since May 2000. At the January 2001 Consumer Electronics Show they announced and demonstrated the first integrated audio device connecting to "over a thousand internet radio stations".
The FW-i1000 was rapidly followed by a slew of other IP-enabled devices. The marketing name "Streamium" and the slogan "Don't dream it, stream-it" was coined and globally registered by Ramon de la Fuente (now at Google) who replaced Tony Cher as a product manager in 2001.

January 2001

- FW-i1000, with iM-networks service offered by Sonicbox, an aggregator of Internet radio service. A limited number of UPnP compliant prototypes were also made for use in the testing of the UPnP AV specifications.

January 2002

- The MCi200, with Philips back-end, several internet based services (and my.philips.com user interface extension protected by a number of patents)
- The iPronto, with WiFi/UPnP, links to security camera and offering a web-based electronic program guide a.k.a. EPG.

January 2003

- The MCi250, an upgrade to the MCi200 with WiFi and UPnP-compliant

Announced at the same event:

- The SL300i and SL400i wireless multi-media adapters
- The MX6000i, with WiFi/UPnP, video, pictures and photo service, music services, 5 DVD changer
- The Streamium-TV, a 32" LCD TV offering similar web-based services as the MX6000i

Both the Streamium-TV and MX6000i were capable of offering video content hosted by a web-based service, the precursor of net TV.

August 2004

- The SL50i wireless PC audio receiver.

September 2004

- The SLA5500 wireless multi-media adapter, to connect to both a PC and an audio system.

September 2005

- The SLA5520 wireless music receiver, the successor of the SLA5500 with access to free Internet radio stations.

June 2006

- WAK700 wireless multiroom music system, with a 40GB hard disk drive to store up to 750 CDs and 3 different ways to listen to music (Listen to different song in each room, take the music from room to room, Simultaneous playback on all stations)
- The WAK3300 wireless music station, with 3 ways to listen to music and 3 different alarm modes.

January 2007

- The WACS7000 wireless multiroom music system, the successor of the WACS700, with a 80GB hard disk drive to store up to 1500 CDs.

June 2007

- The SLM5500 and SLM5520 wireless multimedia adapters, to stream music from PC as the other Streamium devices but also to view pictures and movies stored on your computer on your TV.

January 2008

- The WACS7500 multiroom music system, the successor of the WACS7500 with color display and access to free Internet radio stations.

April 2008

- The WAS6050 wireless music station, with 4 built-in speakers, and access to free Internet Radio stations.

June 2008

- The NP1100 network music player, to connect to both a PC and an audio system, with wireless access to Internet radio and online music services such as Rhapsody (online music service) or Napster.

August 2008

- The MCI300 wireless micro hifi system
- The MCI500H wireless micro hifi system, with a 160GB hard disk drive to store up to 2000 CDs.

November 2008

- The NP2500 network music player, following the same principles as the NP1100 but with color display, the FullSound technology to restore the details in compressed music, and picture streaming
- The NP2900 network music player, with 4 built-in speakers (no need to connect to an audio system), the LivingSound technology to enjoy immersive music over a wider area and picture streaming.

January 2013

as of January 2013 Philips have abandoned the streamium line without explanation.

It seems that the Fidelio line is to fill the gap streamium left.

=== Architecture ===
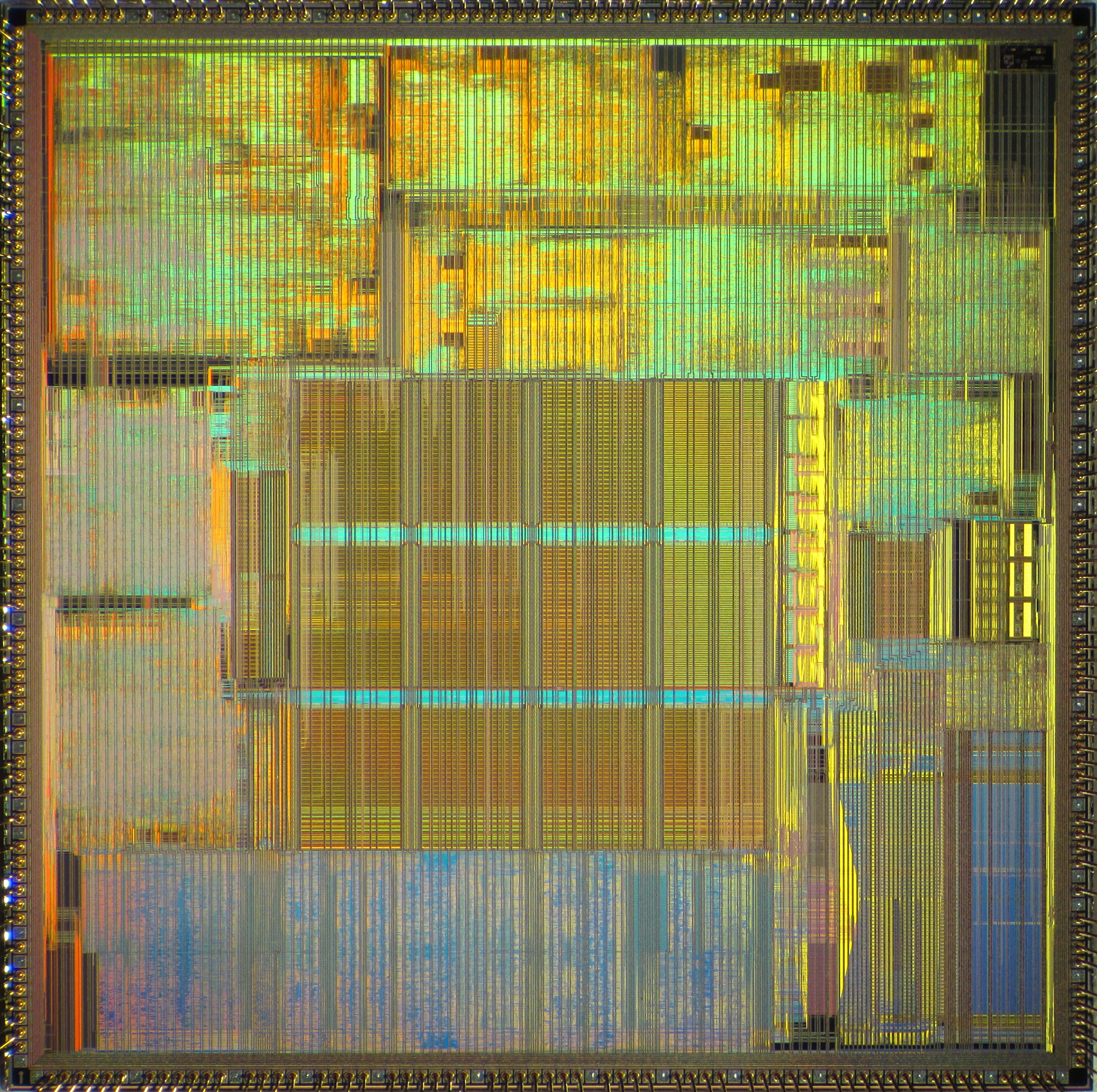
A Philips TriMedia die

Whereas the FW-i1000 used the iM-networks service (then known as "SonicBox"), the end-to-end "Streamium" system designed by Daniel Meirsman, included a Philips owned back-end service (the "ECD-interface").

This back-end service allowed Streamium devices to connect to "any number" of web based content delivery services. The back-end would thereby function as a "switch-board" connecting the content delivery services with individual boxes. Moreover, the back-end service would allow Philips to build out an "after-sales" relationship with their customers through the web-based [UI]-extension and would stimulate some early form of web-based social networking with the streamium cafe web site that was set up by Mark Tuttle.

A navigation tree would be served to the Streamium-device from the Philips back-end, whereas the content itself would be directly streamed from the service to the Streamium-box subject to the site's policy (subject to the compulsory licences...). By manipulating the navigation tree from the front panel of the Streamium-device users could select desired the service, genre, artist, album, track...

From the start, Streamium-devices contained provisions (i.e. an IEEE EUI-64 containing an OUI and a MAC-address, encryption keys, product and software version codes) used to protect streams and support identification mechanisms, as well as allowing downloading of software upgrades (for bug-fixes as well as enabling new features).

In most cases. Streamium functionality was provided by a module (a [PCB]) based on an NXP TriMedia PNX1300. This module implemented:

1. Connectivity to the home network as well as to the Internet (network stack, SAX as opposed to DOM XML-parser, UPnP-stack)

2. Decoding of compressed (audio, image, video) content

A user interface extension was available on the Streamium web-site (my.philips.com) that would allow users to manage their preferences, services and devices.

On the frontpanel or through the on-screen display (OSD) of the Streamium devices, users could mark their favorites or indicate they wanted to learn more about the song being played. The service would then send either an e-mail with more details, or post this info on my.philips.com with a click-through link (i.e. to Amazon.com for purchasing).

=== Technology Concepts ===
Under the direction of the Streamium team, Philips CE contributed significantly to both UPnP and Digital Living Network Alliance (DLNA) and other industry efforts.

The Streamiums were extensively used to build advanced concepts, even at other divisions of Philips such as Philips Semiconductors (now NXP Semiconductors), Philips Research and Philips Medical.

Philips Semiconductors would pick up on the vision of Philips Consumer Electronics and task the "advanced system lab" to prototype this vision (first demos end 2004).

Concepts (such as those used in the Connected Home demos) would then be shown by the Streamium team in the "Philips-CE World Tour", an invitation only event at the yearly Consumer Electronics Show in Las Vegas to a selected audience.

- Demonstration of a portable HDD-based and Wi-Fi enabled UPnP renderer (January 2002) for studies of portable entertainment.
- Demonstration of a fully-fledged UPnP enabled network (January 2003) with multiple renderers, servers and control points
- Bridging between UPnP and Zigbee was demonstrated to control lighting from a UPnP control point as well as a GPRS link that bridged to the UPnP network through a web server (January 2003), linking digital entertainment to home automation and "ambiance control".
- Use cases illustrating the use of RFID in interactive marketing, identification and personalisation (January 2003).
- Tests with the Rhapsody as a UPnP AV-server streaming to an MCi200 (a bit what Sonos is currently offering) (2003).
- Running tests of Apple's Rendezvous protocol on the MCi200 (2003).
- The first demonstration of the NFC smart poster concept with Visa (January 2004).
- Use cases illustrating interoperable DRM (Streamium was one of the devices used to demonstrate the principles underlying the activities of the Coral consortium (January 2004).
- Use cases illustrating the use of recommender technology (January 2004)
- Demonstration (~43 use cases) of a fully connected home including stationary as well as portable devices and mobile phones and executed at the "CES2005 World Tour" by a team of professional actors. (January 2005)
- Use cases in the area of fitness and well-being (January 2005)
- Use cases illustrating uses for UPnP printing (January 2005).
- Experiments with Java-based arcade games

=== Services ===
iM-networks was offered on the FW-i1000 from the start.

The Philips Streamium MX6000i provided traditional home entertainment alongside access to audio-video content from a PC, UPnP mediaserver or online entertainment service. Services included music videos, Web movies, and cinema trailers.

The Philips Streamium service partners were:

- Yahoo LAUNCHcast
- Yahoo! Movies - trailers only
- MP3.com
- Musicmatch Musicmatch Jukebox, Radio MX
- live365.com
- Radio Free Virgin
- Playhouse Radio
- Andante
- Bluebeat
- iFilm - previews and short movies
- Launch - music videos

There was no need to first download files to PC, or even to turn the PC on, to stream multimedia Internet content. (A broadband Internet connection is required.)

A wide array of Yahoo! services including on-demand music videos, movie trailers and clips and photo services was launched together with the Streamium range extension in Spring 2004.

Out of the box consumers would have access to free services. Additionally, a number of services would offer premium (subscription-based) online services allowing consumers to broaden and personalize their home entertainment experience.

== Results ==
In his press conference during the CES2001, Guy Demuynck, then CEO of Philips CE, expressed his vision that the Internet would become as ubiquitous and accessible as the electric grid to devices other than the PC, and that people would increasingly rely on the Internet for information and entertainment.

"The Internet has transformed the way we do business," Demuynck stated, referring not only to communications and promotions but to product design as well. "We intend to put Internet capabilities into many products, making Internet content as accessible as pressing a single button on a TV remote. The Internet dominates all our thinking—it will expand from a browsing activity to an always-on, integral part of daily life," he said.

=== Innovations ===
The early Internet audio and Streamium devices had both constant broadband Internet connectivity and a back-end service provided by Philips to aggregate services for its users. In addition, a UI extension was offered (my.philips) that allowed consumers to manage their devices, external service subscriptions, favorites, as well as to add their own streams. The PC-based UI extension was part of the lean-forward/lean-backward approach to this potentially complicated product range:

- Lean backward functionality was accessible on the device directly
- Lean forward functionality was relegated to the PC

In essence, the Philips service offering was a walled garden; but the fact that consumers could add and access their own favorite streams made it more of an open system. Although never published, Streamium relied on an XML-based API—not unlike the APIs we see today published by Web-service providers (YouTube, eBay,...) -- and implemented XML-based APIs as offered by its service providers.

=== Commercial impact ===
Unfortunately the first Streamium generations lacked support for a number of important media formats such as those included in the Windows Media technologies which hampered their commercial success. Philips' legal team had issues with the non-assertion clause that Microsoft required potential licensees to sign without prior opportunity to check the IP involved. Since Philips did and still does own a substantial patent-portfolio, product management was not allowed to risk signing away rights on a substantial number of important patents.

=== Consumer testing ===
To some extent consumers were involved in some of the design of the Streamiums. Of course, the classical focus test groups were used to find out what features consumers would deem important. But also after the official announcement, a limited number of pre-production versions of the Streamiums would be made available to a limited number of volunteer beta-testers that could sign up via a Philips web-site.

== See also ==
- Digital media receiver another name for Wireless Media Adapter
- SimpleCenter a UPnP AV MediaServer
