= Sound trademark =

Auditory trademark

A sound trademark, sound logo, audio logo, or brand sound is a trademark where sound is used to perform the trademark function of uniquely identifying the commercial origin of products or services.

In recent times, sounds have been increasingly used as trademarks in the marketplace. However, it has traditionally been difficult to protect sounds as trademarks through registration, as a sound was not considered to be a 'trademark'. This issue was addressed by the World Trade Organization Agreement on Trade-Related Aspects of Intellectual Property Rights, which broadened the legal definition of trademark to encompass "any sign...capable of distinguishing the goods or services of one undertaking from those of other undertaking" (article 15(1)).

Despite the recognition which must be accorded to sound trademarks in most countries, the graphical representation of such marks sometimes constitutes a problem for trademark owners seeking to protect their marks, and different countries have different methods for dealing with this issue.

== Sound branding ==
Sound branding (also known as audio branding, music branding, sonic branding, acoustic branding) is "the strategic use of sound … in positively differentiating a product or service, enhancing recall, creating preference, building trust, and even increasing sales." Audio branding can tell you whether the brand is romantic and sensual, family-friendly and everyday, indulgent and luxurious, without ever hearing a word or seeing a picture. And it gives a brand an additional way to break through audiences' shortened attention spans.

=== Sound logos ===
Wikimedia sound trademark (The Sound of Human Knowledge)
Wikimedia's sound logo, an example of a sound logo

The sound logo (or audio mnemonic) is one of the tools of sound branding, along with the jingle, brand music, and brand theme. A sound logo (or audio logo or sonic logo) is a short distinctive melody or other sequence of sound, mostly positioned at the beginning or ending of a commercial. It can be seen as the acoustic equivalent of a visual logo. Often a combination of both types of logo is used to enforce the recognition of a brand. An example is the T-Mobile logo and ringtone composed by Lance Massey, the Intel logo composed by Walter Werzowa, or the Michelin logo composed by Sixième Son, who also composed the "Samsung Tune".

The sound logo leads to learning effects on consumer's perception of a certain product. A melody is the most memorable sequence of sound, since, when a melody starts, the human brain automatically expects the ending. However, some brands realize the importance the sound their brand can make and attempt to capitalize on its own uniqueness. A good example is the motorcycle brand Harley-Davidson, which, in 1994, filed a sound trademark application for its distinctive V-twin engine sound. It realized that if it could capture its own sound, it could distinguish the brand at every point of customer interaction. Just like a visual logo, the most essential qualities of a sound logo are uniqueness, memorability, and relevancy to the brand promise.

Radio and television stations create their own audio identities using melodic themes to strengthen their brand. Notable examples include the short variations of the BBC Radio 2 or Classic FM jingles. In recent years, television station idents have also introduced their own audio identities to strengthen their brand recognitions.

There are typically four to six steps involved in creating a sound logo:

1. The audio strategy development phase where the brand essence and other foundational elements is confirmed.
2. The audio touch point analysis phase where all places the brand will come in contact with customers and other stakeholders is identified.
3. The concept phase where an audio collage is created to help define texture, rhythm, melody, harmony, and instrumentation that best convey the brand values and then the unique sound or piece of music is composed to convey the distinctive brand essence and values.
4. The test and refine phase to where the combination of sound elements are optimized to ensure that they communicate essence, values, and promise of the brand. In this phase, psycho-acoustic research would be conducted, if needed.
5. The implementation stage to create the adaptations for each touch point.
6. The handover phase where an audio style guide is developed to help the supervisor or manager of the brand recommend, plan, and supervise the installation of the audio brand elements into devices, expo booths, displays, call centers, and other places where it will be used. Additionally, the licensing or ownership of the branding elements or all applicable usage rights, depending on the agreement, are formally transferred to brand.

Once completed, the audio elements should be managed just like the rest of a company's brand assets.

Recent professional and legal discussions have highlighted the increasing use of sound logos as a form of non-traditional trademark. As analysed in a 2024 forum organised by the International Federation of Intellectual Property Attorneys (FICPI), sound logos are being adopted more widely in response to the growth of digital media, multiscreen consumption, and audio-led touchpoints, while raising specific challenges regarding registrability, acquired distinctiveness, and consistent use across jurisdictions.

=== Environmental sound design ===
Creating a brand experience using sound is also within the area of sound branding. The opportunities for creating a sound branding experience that conveys a brand essence and soul is possible. Bentley Motors, for instance, recently looked to create a unique brand experience by replacing all interior mechanical sounds with sound that had been created for their Continental GT car. Roland Garros, home of the French Open created an audio identity that is used in its facilities and played during award ceremonies as well as opening and closing ceremonies.

In a retail environments, sound branding extends to the use of sound in order to enhance the consumer experience and influence behavior . "For instance, an academic study that took place in a Scotland supermarket found that sales of wines displayed side-by-side and priced similarly responded to music. On days when French music played, French wines outsold German wines. German wines, however, outsold French ones on days when typical German music was playing.

British department store chain Selfridges is one of the notable brands to have enjoyed success with this approach, creating distinct consumer 'zones' within its stores, which change visually and sonically so customers know they have passed into a new department. These zones are often tailored to suit a particular product, customer profile, season or even times of the day and week. The Swedish Mall, Emporia, has also found success using soundscapes to help guide customers. Unibail Rodamco upscale malls have an audio identity that is adapted to their parking lots, entryways, walkways, even chairs and plant walls and extends into their advertising.

=== Branding sound technology and devices ===
Sound design for mobile phones, ATMs, laptop computers, PDAs, and countless other devices can improve the user experience by making tasks easier and more enjoyable. These sounds can also reveal something about the company that created the experience (and, in the case of personalized ringtones, something about the user themselves).

Sound branding also encompasses the use of targeted audio messages by organizations to communicate with customers over the telephone, known as on-hold marketing or on-hold messaging. These messages are typically deployed on an organizations interactive voice response (IVR) switchboard system or when customers are placed on hold and incorporate short, informative voice messages often accompanied by music.

A study commissioned by audio branding specialist PHMG provided insight into consumer perceptions of on-hold marketing. It revealed 70 percent of consumers are put on hold for more than 50 percent of their calls and 68 percent of consumers are put on hold for longer than one minute. When on hold, 73 percent of callers want to hear something other than beeps or silence and 76 percent preferred to hear something other than Muzak.

Companies integrate sound branding and audio styles into marketing efforts in several ways — by including the sounds at key points in advertising materials via video-based or sound-based ads both online and via traditional channels like TV and radio. Newer technologies for small recordable devices like the Botski, which is a sticker-based recordable device that can be applied to substrates like paper, cardboard or other packaging and or marketing materials to help brands differentiate themselves beyond visual mediums.

=== Other forms of sound in branding ===
Sound branding encompasses many other tactics intended to convey organizational or product identity (who an organization is and what it stands for); enhance consumers' experience of a product or service; or extend an organization's relationship with its audience. Another form of sound branding involves an organization's public association with or sponsorship of a musical enterprise—a non-profit music organization, for instance, or perhaps a music artist or group of artists. For example, some companies completely unrelated to music offer free music downloads on their websites. Ostensibly intended to demonstrate the sponsoring organization's good will from a cultural patronage stand point, practices like these also brand the organization by calling public attention to its beliefs, its values, and its aesthetic sensibilities.

It is arguable that sound branding is now using 'subliminal' brand placement in pop song lyrics to echo a corporate slogan, a company's 'Unique Selling Point' or 'brand values' (rather than the 'old fashioned' mentioning of brands / products directly). An example of this would be Pharrell Williams's 2005 song 'Can I Have It Like That' (featuring Gwen Stefani), with the chorus which echoed the Burger King advertising slogan "Have It Your Way".

=== Audio marketing ===
Audio marketing, also known as on-hold marketing or on-hold messaging, is increasingly being seen as an important element of audio branding. It involves the creation of brand-congruent voice and music tracks, which are used by companies to communicate marketing messages to customers over the telephone. Typically, these messages are played while a customer is waiting on hold or while they are being transferred. They are also frequently used as part of interactive voice response systems designed to handle large volumes of calls.

Different attributes of voice and music, including tempo, tone, pitch and volume, are all taken into account in order to create messaging that reinforce the values conveyed through a company's visual branding.

Changes in consumer perceptions towards audio marketing have played a large part in its adoption. Negative perceptions were traditionally attached to on-hold marketing but a more recent survey conducted by CNN found that 70% of callers in the United States who are made to hold the line in silence will hang up within 60 seconds, while further research by PHMG found 73 percent of consumers want to hear something more than beeps or silence on hold.

== Registration of sound marks in different jurisdictions ==
=== Australia ===
==== Graphic representation ====
In Australia, sound trademarks are generally acceptable if they can be represented by musical notation. According to the Australian trademarks Office, an application for a sound trademark which cannot be graphically represented with musical notation must include the following requirements.

- a graphic representation of the mark (e.g. "CLIP CLOP MOO");
- a clear and concise description of the trademark (examples are given below);
  - The trademark is a sound mark. It comprises the sound of dogs barking to the traditional tune "Greensleeves" as rendered in the audio tape accompanying the application.
  - The trademark consists of the sound of two steps taken by a cow on pavement, followed by the sound of a cow mooing (clip, clop, MOO) as rendered in the recording accompanying the application.
  - The trademark consists of the sound of a soprano voice singing wordlessly to the tune represented in the musical score attached to the application. The trademark is demonstrated in the recording accompanying the application form.
  - The trademark consists of a repeated rapid tapping sound made by a wooden stick tapping on a metal garbage can lid which gradually becomes louder over approximately 10 seconds duration. The sound is demonstrated in the recordings accompanying the application.
- a recording of the trademark which can be played back on media which is easily and commonly accessible.

Other requirements are set out in the trademarks Office Manual of Practice and Procedure issued by IP Australia.

=== China ===
In China, Section 13 of the trademark administrative regulations states an application for a sound trademark is permitted, and shall include a “compliant sound sample, a description of the mark, and a description of the mark’s intended use. Sound mark descriptions must match the provided sound samples, and such marks shall be described using staff or numbered notation. A detailed written description may be used if staff or numbered notation is impractical.”

Tencent won the first administrative appeals case under these rules against the China National Intellectual Property Administration in 2018 for its "Di-Di-Di-Di-Di-Di" sound; at issue was whether Tencent’s sound trademark application was compliant with the rules.

=== European Union ===
In the European Union, Article 4 of Council Regulation (EC) No. 40-94 of 20 December 1993 ("signs of which a Community trademark may consist") relevantly states that any CTM may consist of "any signs capable of being represented graphically...provided that such signs are capable of distinguishing the goods or services of one undertaking from those of other undertakings". In Shield Mark BV vs Joost Kist (case C-283/01) the EcJ basically repeats the criteria from Sieckmann v German Patent Office (case C-273/00) that graphical representation, preferably means by images, lines or characters, and that the representation must be clear, precise, self-contained, easily accessible, intelligible, durable and objective.

This definition generally encompasses sound marks, and therefore an applicant for a CTM may use musical notation to graphically represent their trademark. A piece of music—a tune, or a ring tone on a telephone—can be easily registered as a trademark (provided, of course, that it meets the Community trademark tests for registrability and distinctiveness). While tunes are capable of registration, before 2005 noises were not. The sound of a dog barking or the crash of surf cannot be recorded in musical notation and sonograms were not accepted by the OHIM trademark registry. A change in legislation occurred in 2005 so that now the Office accepts sonograms as a graphical representation of a trademark if they are accompanied by an MP3 sound file when filing a trademark electronically.

=== United States ===
In the United States, the test for whether a sound can serve as a trademark "depends on [the] aural perception of the listener which may be as fleeting as the sound itself unless, of course, the sound is so inherently different or distinctive that it attaches to the subliminal mind of the listener to be awakened when heard and to be associated with the source or event with which it struck".

This was the fairly strict test applied by the US Trademark Trial and Appeal Board in the case of General Electric Broadcasting Co., 199 USPQ 560, in relation to the timed toll of a ship's bell clock.

More famously, Harley-Davidson attempted to register as a trademark the distinctive "chug" of the Harley-Davidson motorcycle engine. In 1994, the company filed its application with the following description: "The mark consists of the exhaust sound of applicant's motorcycles, produced by V-twin, common crankpin motorcycle engines when the goods are in use." Nine of Harley-Davidson's competitors filed oppositions against the application, arguing that cruiser-style motorcycles of various brands use the same crankpin V-twin engine which produces the same sound. After six years of litigation, with no end in sight, in early 2000, Harley-Davidson withdrew its application.

Other companies have been more successful in registering their distinctive sounds: MGM and the lion's roar, the NBC chimes, famous basketball team the Harlem Globetrotters and their theme song, "Sweet Georgia Brown", Intel and the three-second chord sequence used with the Pentium processor, THX and its "Deep Note", Federal Signal Corporation and the sound of its "Q2B" fire truck siren, AT&T and the spoken letters "AT&T" accompanied by music, RKO with a combined moving image and sound mark depicting the RKO Pictures radio tower transmitting a Morse-code like signal, and 20th Century Studios with the famous introductory fanfare composed by Alfred Newman.

== Examples ==
- 20th Century Studios fanfare by Alfred Newman
- Paramount Pictures fanfare by Michael Giacchino
- Columbia Pictures fanfare
- MGM lion roars
- THX Deep Note
- Netflix tu-dum sound logo
- Intel jingle
- RKO Pictures Morse code beeps
- Universal Pictures fanfare
- Warner Bros. Pictures fanfare
- Gojek jingle by Amp.Amsterdam
- Haleon jingle
- LG Life's Good Jingle
- Michelin jingle by Sixième Son
- Samsung jingle by Musikvergnuegen
- Channel 4 Fourscore by David Dundas
- NBC chimes
- Renault jingle
- AT&T 4-note Firefly jingle, the 2015 version is a guitar rearrangement of it by Made Music Studio
- WGBH-TV crescendo by Gershon Kingsley
- ABS-CBN 6-note (aka. "The Philippine's Largest Network) jingle by Dominic Salustiano
- Nokia tune, based on the recognizable 13-note phrase from Gran Vals, attributed to Spanish composer Francisco Tárrega
- "Sweet Georgia Brown" as performed by Brother Bones and His Shadows, theme of the Harlem Globetrotters

== See also ==
- Producer tag – Short phrase crediting the music producer
- Music in advertising
