= Radio Free Virgin =

Radio Free Virgin was a digital radio broadcaster started in early 1999 and a member company of the Virgin Group. Their programming consisted of over 60 professionally programmed channels playing various genres of music. It quickly gained popularity and its downloadable radio player reached the 1 million downloads within a few months in early 2000. The company was privately held corporation funded by Richard Branson and was a unit of Virgin Audio Holdings, LLC. It was headed by Zack Zalon and Brendon Cassidy who were early pioneers in the internet music business. Dave Gordon was an early webmaster for the fledgling group.

While initially a completely free service, programming was ultimately broadcast over the Internet in a two-tier setup: a free tier that allowed access to a subset of channels and a monthly-subscription tier ("RFV Royal") for paying customers with higher-quality streaming audio and access to a greater number of channels. By March 2003, Radio Free Virgin servers accommodated 2.8 million unique listeners per month and Virgin was offering an integrated digital download and subscription service that was in direct competition with iTunes, Napster and Rhapsody called Virgin Digital. Radio Free Virgin (RFV) was also available at the time via the Philips Streamium device, delivering its channels in MP3Pro.

As of February 2007, the service ceased to operate. It ended with the following cryptic message posted to its homepage:

"Letter from the road - January 3rd, 2007: Dear loyal listener... This marks the 44th blog posting from my trip. It's been particularly cold on this leg of the journey. I guess that's what you get for hitchhiking Alaska this time of year. I've been calling the office for almost two weeks straight, but no answer. I'm starting to think that they sent me up here on a ruse of some sort. Like maybe if they got me out of the office on my first vacation in 7 years they'd have a chance to actually have some fun or something. I'm pretty damn sure I heard Antoinette say something about St. John, but that could have just been the voices again. I spent about fifteen miles with a group of hippies last night. I mean real hippies, not the kind that don't shower and eat raw corn all the time. Bona-fide hippies. Got tuned-out and turned-on in '68 or something and never looked back. Main girl is called Ragina (nasty) and thinks it's 1970. Literally. Keeps bitching about Nixon and how the commies are going to save the world. Still, I may be in love with her. I have my reasons. My thoughts run to the office again - seventy-one of us, all crammed in that little space. Angeline (my driver) with that floppy mane of hair and sarcastic attitude that can only come from an upbringing in rural Wales, Sophie (chef) and her Sonoma foie-gras compote topped Roti A La Broche and constant humming out-of-tune, Vanity (really her name, types up my dictation when Delissa is at lunch) plucking her brows. I miss them all. But I know that being on the road is important for me, too. That the journey is the journey and not the destination, or however the saying goes. That time spent away from the office will make me healthier and the company right along with it. Still, I'm concerned that nobody's answering the phones..."
