= PHMG (company) =

Provider of audio branding services

- Type: Employee Ownership Trust
- Industry: Business Communication, Communications services, Customer Experience, Audio Branding, Cloud telephony, AI receptionist
- Founded: 1998; 28 years ago
- Founder: Grant Reed
- Headquarters: Manchester, U.K.
- Area served: Worldwide
- Key people: Jason Daye (CEO)
- Number of employees: 800+
- Website: www.phmg.com

PHMG is a global business communications company headquartered in Manchester, England. The company provides services including audio branding, cloud telephony, customer experience consultancy, and AI-enabled communication services. It serves clients internationally.

The company was founded in 1998 as PleaseHoldUK, initially specialising in telephone-based audio and on-hold marketing. It later expanded into audio branding and sonic identity before broadening its services into other areas of business and customer communication.

PHMG has around 40,000 clients worldwide.

== History ==
In 1998, PHMG was founded as PleaseHoldUK in Chester, England. Its office relocated to Manchester in 2000, where the global headquarters has been based since.

The agency has rebranded several times. PleaseHoldUK became PH Media Group in 2008, before transitioning to PHMG in 2016. Following growth into new territories, the company underwent a rebrand in 2022 – which included the creation of a new sonic signature – but continues to operate as PHMG.

In 2025, PHMG became majority employee-owned through an Employee Ownership Trust. The same year, it received the King's Award for Enterprise in International Trade.

== Technology and platform ==
PHMG provides technology-related services for business communications, including cloud telephony, call routing, customer communication consultancy and automated call handling.

The company works with third-party communications platforms, including GoTo Connect, and provides services covering system configuration, call-flow design, implementation and ongoing support. Its work combines cloud-based telephone systems with branded audio and customer communication services.

PHMG also offers Complete Caller Experience, a service focused on reviewing and optimizing telephone systems and caller journeys. This includes the organization of call routes, automated greetings and other elements of telephone-based customer communication.

The company's technology portfolio also includes AI-enabled receptionist services, designed to handle incoming inquiries and automate aspects of customer communication.

== Global Footprint ==
=== Offices ===
PHMG operates three staffed offices in the United Kingdom and United States and has a number of additional business addresses in territories where it serves clients.

PHMG office locations
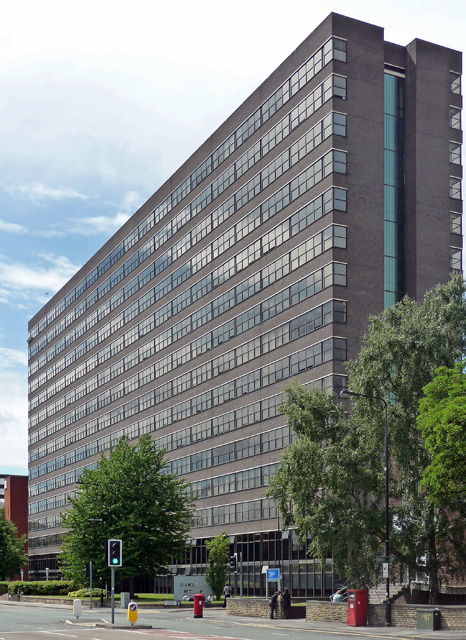
Manchester, England (Global headquarters)

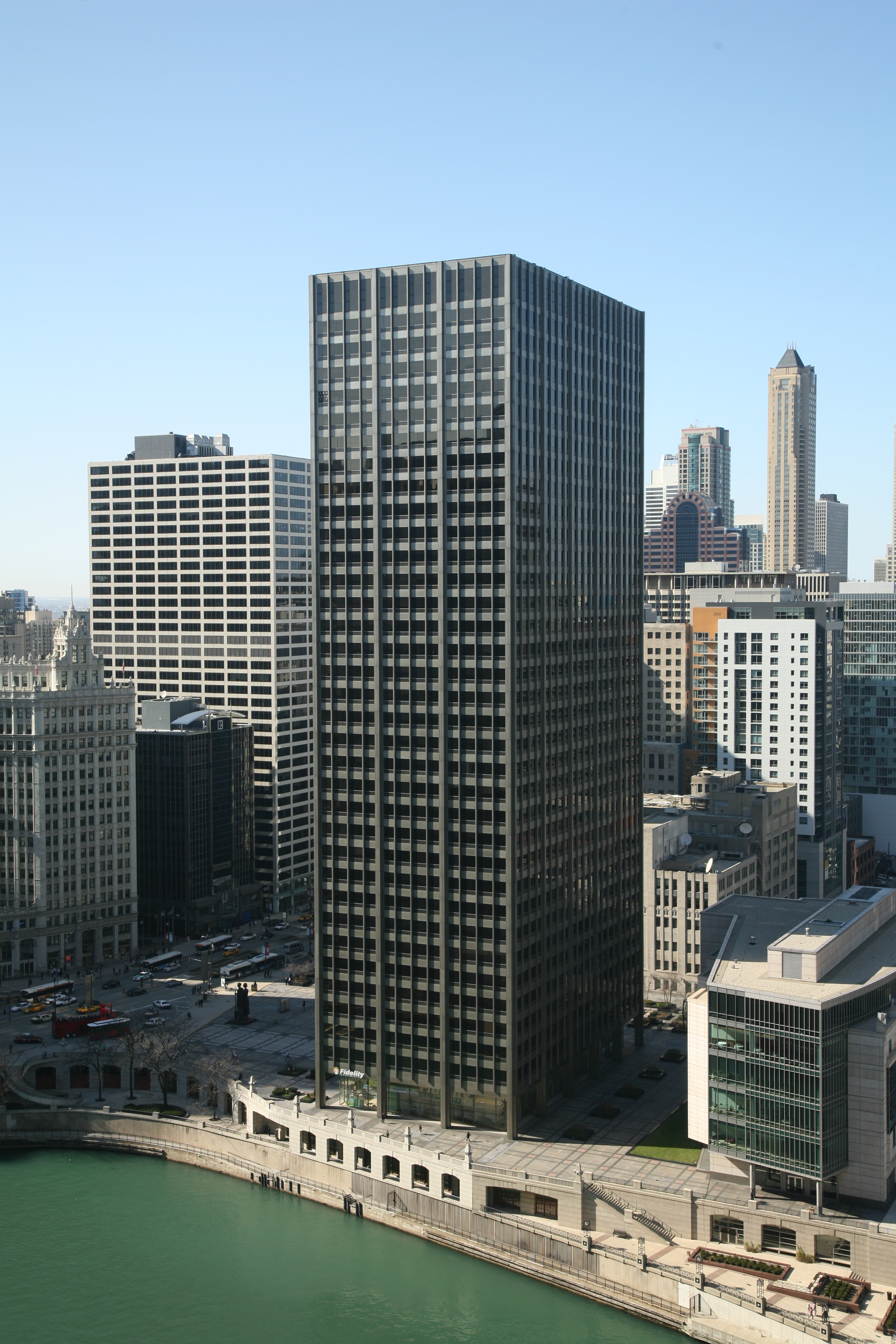
Chicago, Illinois, U.S.

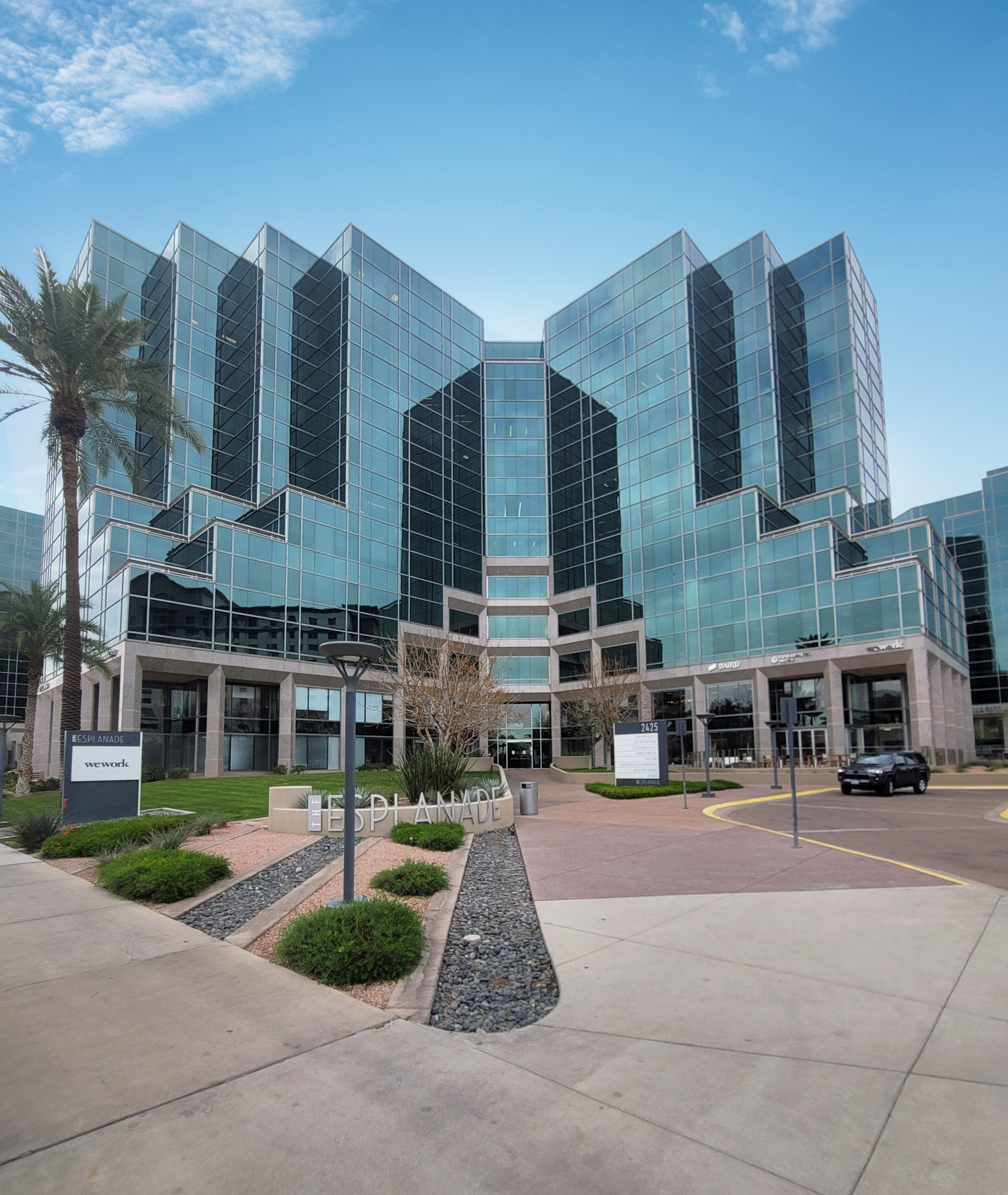
Phoenix, Arizona, U.S.

Tampa, Florida, U.S.

=== PHMG Foundation ===
In 2013, PHMG launched the PHMG Foundation in support of charitable causes across the territories it operates in - the United Kingdom, the United States and Australia.

=== Awards and accreditations ===
In 2014, the company was named by Investec in their Mid-Market 100 list - as Please Hold (UK) - ranking it as one of the 100 fastest-growing private companies in the UK and recognizing it as the world's largest audio branding agency. Continued growth saw the company move up the Investec Mid-Market 100 list in 2015, from 48th position to 35th.

PHMG was included in the 'FT 1000: Europe's Fastest Growing Companies' list in 2018, as well as being named on the 2017, 2018 and 2019 'Greater Manchester Ward Hadaway Fastest 50’ lists.

In 2018, PHMG was named as one of 'Chicago's Best and Brightest Companies to Work For' and was ranked tenth in the 'Leadership and Culture at Work: The CMI/Glassdoor Top 20' list. In 2019, the organization was awarded a 'Great Place to Work' certification, as well as being named as part of the European Business Awards 'Ones to Watch' list.

In 2025, PHMG received the King's Award for Enterprise in International Trade, recognising its sustained international growth and global client reach.

== Marketing ==
=== Market research ===
PHMG has commissioned several studies to gauge perceptions among both consumers and businesses of music on hold and on-hold marketing.

Findings include that American consumers are more patient than British consumers; and that men are more patient than women.

Other findings include a 27% rise in the use of regional accents and dialect by UK businesses between January 2012 and January 2013. Research revealed the Scottish accent is perceived as trustworthy and reassuring while the Yorkshire accent, used by brands such as O2 in television and radio advertising, is seen as wise and honest.

Findings published in 2018 of a study conducted among 1,000 UK consumers revealed music can be more effective than visuals in shaping perceptions of a company's brand, with 60% of respondents deeming music more memorable when used in marketing. The same research in the US, conducted among 1,000 consumers, found 67% believe music is more memorable when used in marketing while in Australia, 66% of 1,000 respondents considered it more memorable.

=== Regulatory matters ===
In November 2021, the Australian Competition and Consumer Commission ACCC raised concerns about potentially unfair terms in PHMG's Australian customer contracts, particularly automatic renewals, early termination charges and limitations on consumer guarantee rights..

PHMG did not accept that its terms were unfair or breached Australian Consumer Law, but cooperated with the investigation and agreed to amend its contracts. Changes included introducing month-to-month renewals after the initial contract period, allowing cancellation with 30 days' notice and clarifying customers' consumer guarantee rights.
