= David-Andersen radio =

Former Norwegian radio and television manufacturer

- Company type: Aksjeselskap
- Industry: Electronics
- Founded: 1945
- Defunct: 1969
- Fate: Production ended; renamed AGA A/S
- Headquarters: Oslo, Norway
- Key people: Arthur David-Andersen Jr.; Ivar David-Andersen; Gregers Kure
- Products: Radios, television sets

David-Andersen radio was a Norwegian radio and television factory started by two of the heirs to the David-Andersen goldsmith firm. The company came under Swedish ownership during the 1960s, and production was closed.

== A goldsmith's name on radios ==
David-Andersen Radio A/S was started in 1945 by the brothers Arthur Jr. (1905–1982) and Ivar David-Andersen together with Gregers Kure of Emaljeverket. It was one of many radio factories established in the postwar years, when the home market was insatiable after the German occupiers had confiscated all radios in 1941. The brothers were the eldest sons of the goldsmith Arthur David-Andersen, and Ivar, also a goldsmith, was the one to take over and develop the family business further.

Arthur Jr. qualified as a diploma engineer in electronics at the prestigious engineering college in Zurich, the ETH, in 1930. He ran Telefunken's radio factory in Norway in the 1930s, laying the basis for starting his own factory in the postwar period, and it was also he who ran the daily operation of the radio factory. Gregers Kure had also trained in Zurich, the year after David-Andersen, and the two probably became acquainted there if they did not know each other already, both being children of leading Oslo factory owners, raised in the west end of Oslo and pupils at Ris gymnasium.

== Factory in Norabakken ==
The radio factory got going in 1946 in the newly built large industrial complex Rosenborgkvartalet at Pilestredet 75, also called Norabakken, by Bislett in Oslo. David-Andersen's radio sets did relatively well in the heated radio market, between the leading Tandberg and Radionette, challengers such as Edda and Østfold Radio, and foreign brands. With a family name that for many stood for quality and exclusive design in gold and silverware and jewelry, David-Andersen won a place as a quality brand for radios on a par with Tandberg, and about 20 different models and variants of radio sets were produced, up to the last transistor-based travel radio from 1959.

== Investment in television ==
Ahead of the introduction of regular television broadcasts in Norway in 1960, David-Andersen Radio sought to take a share of the large television market expected to come, and both expertise and new capital were brought into the company from Sweden, from the industrial conglomerate AGA, which had begun with gas but became active in a range of areas, including radio and television production.

The two television models, TV 1-21 and 2-21, were based on base models from AGA, developed at what was described as "one of Europe's largest and most modern TV laboratories," advertised together with assurances that the television was otherwise Norwegian-made. This meant that televisions were delivered in parts from Sweden and finally assembled in Oslo, an arrangement many Norwegian producers used as long as the import duty was high, 24 percent, on finished televisions, while the duty on parts was only ten percent. Many thus found work in assembly in Oslo, among them Reidun Sletten from Follebu, who, curious about the new technology, answered a job advertisement and was trained in soldering before she "sat and soldered every single component in the TV set" for a couple of years. For David-Andersen, the cooperation with Sweden was the explanation to customers for the low price and at the same time an assurance of good local service; the retail price in 1960 for model 1-21 was 2,200 kroner, 50 kroner extra for legs.

== From television to gas ==
The AGA heir Gunnar Dalén came onto the board in 1959 and became the main owner in 1962, when the share capital was expanded from 150,000 to 650,000 kroner as AGA and Dalén injected capital and ended up with the largest shareholding. By 1969 all production of radio and television in the company had ended, and David-Andersen Radio changed its name to AGA A/S, a Norwegian subsidiary of AGA that moved on to entirely different products.

== Bibliography ==
- Holm, Arne O. (2006). Store norske kvinner.
