= Tandberg (disambiguation) =

Tandberg is a surname and name of several companies:

== People ==
- Bernhard Tandberg, Norwegian farmer and politician
- Carl Frederick Tandberg (1910–1988), American bass fiddle musician
- Christian Hansen Tandberg, Norwegian farmer and politician
- Erik Tandberg, Norwegian bobsledder
- Gulbrand Eriksen Tandberg, Norwegian farmer and politician
- Gudbrand Bernhardsen Tandberg, Norwegian politician
- Jack Tandberg (1931–1981), American cameraman killed while filming The Five of Me
- Jens Frølich Tandberg (1852–1922), Norwegian bishop of Oslo
- Johan Jørgen Tandberg, Norwegian priest and politician
- Monna Tandberg (1939–2025), Norwegian actress
- Olle Tandberg, Swedish heavyweight champion
- Ron Tandberg (1943–2018), Australian illustrator and political cartoonist
- Vebjørn Tandberg (1904–1978), Norwegian electronics engineer and industrialist

== Companies ==
- Tandberg, manufacturer of video conferencing equipment, based in Oslo, Norway
- Tandberg Audio, defunct manufacturer of high-end-audio equipment
- Tandberg Data, manufacturer of computer terminals and data storage devices
- Tandberg Educational, now part of SANAKO, a provider of language teaching products
- Tandbergs Radiofabrikk, the original company (radio factory) founded in 1933 by Vebjørn Tandberg
- Tandberg Storage, manufacturer of magnetic tape data storage devices
- Tandberg Television, manufacturer of professional digital video equipment

== See also ==
- Johan Christian Tandberg Castberg
