= Tandberg Data =

Computer data storage products company

- Industry: Storage
- Headquarters: Lysaker
- Products: RDX RDX QuikStor RDX QuikStation8 RDX QuikStation4 RDX Media- HDD & SSD RDX QuadPAK RDX Tencase
- Number of employees: 350 (Jan 2012)
- Website: tandberg-data.com/en-GB

Tandberg Data is a data storage brand specializing in tape and removable disk backup solutions, particularly based on LTO and RDX technologies.

The Tandberg Data brand has historically been associated with the German company Tandberg Data GmbH, which was focused on data storage products including tape drives, libraries, and RDX removable disk systems.

Tandberg Data used to manufacture computer terminals (e.g., TDV 2200), keyboards, and other hardware.

The German entity Tandberg Data GmbH entered liquidation proceedings in early 2025. .

== History ==
- Tandberg radio factory was founded in Oslo on 25 January 1933 by Vebjørn Tandberg.
- In 1970, Tandberg produces its first data tape drives.
- In December 1978, Tandbergs Radiofabrikk goes bankrupt.
- In January 1979, Siemens and the state of Norway establish Tandberg Data, rescuing the data storage and computer terminal divisions from the ashes. Siemens holds 51% of the new company and controls it. The other divisions of Tandberg go to Norsk Data.
- In 1981, Tandberg becomes a founding member of QIC committee for standardising interfaces and recording formats, and produces its first streaming linear tape drive.
- In 1984, Tandberg Data goes public.
- In 1990, Siemens sells most of its shares when merging its computer business with Nixdorf.
- In 1991, The terminal business is split off as Tandberg Data Display, which ends up in the Swedish company MultiQ.
- In 2003, Tandberg Storage and its subsidiary O-Mass split and became separate companies, also listed on Oslo Stock Exchange. Tandberg Data is the largest owner of Tandberg Storage with a 33.48% stake.
- On 30 August 2006 Tandberg Data purchased the assets of Exabyte. Combined revenue is expected to be US$215 Million for 2006.
- On 15 May 2007 Tandberg Data sold all remaining Tandberg Storage shares.
- On 9 January 2008 Pat Clarke was promoted CEO of Tandberg Data.
- On 12 September 2008 Tandberg Data announced the reacquisition of Tandberg Storage.
- On 24 April 2009 Tandberg Data ASA and Tandberg Storage ASA filed for bankruptcy.
- On 19 May 2009 Tandberg Data announced that the new holding company, TAD Holding AS, was established, owning all global Tandberg Data subsidiaries, including Tandberg Storage ASA. Cyrus Capital is the majority shareholder and owner of the newly established company. Operations in Norway continue in the newly formed company Tandberg Data Norge AS.
- On 22 January 2014 Tandberg Data was acquired by Overland Storage.
- Opening of insolvency proceedings and business closure for Tandberg Data GmbH in Dortmund on January 2, 2025

== Continuity and distribution ==
Following the liquidation of Tandberg Data GmbH, Tandberg Data-branded RDX storage products continued to be commercially available through new distribution arrangements.

In Europe, Tandberg Data RDX storage products are distributed by Electronic Parts (eParts), which has been identified by several European IT industry publications as the brand's master distributor for the EMEA region.

== Current products ==
The Tandberg Data brand is primarily associated with RDX removable disk backup solutions, which are used for data protection, archiving, and long-term storage in professional and industrial environments.

== Tandberg Storage ==
Tandberg Storage ASA
- Type: Subsidiary
- Industry: Computer data storage
- Founded: 22 May 2003
- Defunct: 24 April 2009
- Fate: Bankruptcy
- Headquarters: Lysaker, Norway
- Key people: Kevin Devlin (CEO); Øivind Lund (Chair)
- Revenue: 236 million kr
- Net income: NOK −23 million
- Number of employees: 54
- Parent: Tandberg Data

Tandberg Storage ASA was a magnetic tape data storage company based in Lysaker, Norway. The company was a subsidiary of Tandberg Data. The company was spun off from Tandberg Data in 2003 to focus exclusively on tape drives. It was purchased by the same company in 2008. Tandberg Storage developed four drive series, all based on Linear Tape-Open (LTO) specifications. Manufacturing was outsourced to the Chinese-based Lafè Peripherals International. Tandberg Storage also owned 93.5% of O-Mass AS. The company was declared bankrupt together with Tandberg Data in 2009.

=== History ===
Tandberg Storage was established as a spin-off of Tandberg Data on 22 May 2003. Tandberg Storage had previously been an integrated part of Tandberg Data, but management wanted the two companies to follow separate research and development strategies. While Tandberg Data retained responsibility on complete storage and automation systems, Tandberg Storage would focus on advanced tape-drive technologies. Tandberg Storage was established with 37 research and development employees, plus a 93.5% ownership of O-Mass. The company was listed on the Oslo Stock Exchange on 2 October 2003, with the owners of Tandberg Data receiving all the shares in Tandberg Storage.

The initial goal of the company was to develop a LTO-2 linear tape-open drive within a half-height form factor. While the underlying technology had been developed, the main components needed to be developed, in particular the drive mechanism. A working system was demonstrated in December 2003, and in June 2004 the first complete prototype could be tested. In October, the test program started, and from December verification was initiated with the LTO Committee. The drive was approved on 11 March 2005. In the second half of 2005, Tandberg Storage developed Serial Attached SCSI and application and data integration. These were both launched in 2006. In 2005, the company also started development of a half-height LTO-3 drive. The product was launched in 2007. The following year, a no-encryption LTO-4 was launched.

In November 2008, Tandberg Storage merged with Tandberg Data, with the latter paying the former's owners in shares. Both companies had been having financial problems, and the cooperation between the two had been difficult during 2008. Tandberg Storage was at the time the largest supplier to Tandberg Data. By merging, the managements hoped to gain synergy effects between the two companies. Until the announcement of the merger in September, Tandberg Storage's share price had fallen 89% since the start of the year. Following the announcement, the share price fell a further 35%. The take-over involved a refinancing of the debt in Tandberg Storage. Tandberg Storage remained a subsidiary.

=== Operations ===
The company was based at Lysaker in Bærum, just outside Oslo, Norway. Of the 54 employees in 2007, 45 worked within research and development. The main competitors offering LTO drives were Hewlett-Packard, IBM and Quantum.

=== Products ===
Tandberg Storage produced a full range of Linear Tape-Open drives, between 100 and 800 gigabytes. Manufactured by Lafè Peripherals International of China, there are four models available. All drives were built around a common half-height aluminum casting. All drives, except the TS200, have variable transfer rate systems to match host transfer speeds. All drives have the lowest power consumption in the industry, and do not require external fans. In 2006, Tandberg Storage held a 26% worldwide market share.

Tape drives
Specification	TS1600	TS800	TS400	TS200
Standard	LTO-4	LTO-3	LTO-2	LTO-1
Transfer rate	80 MB/s	60 MB/s	24 MB/s	16 MB/s
Interface	SCSI Ultra-160; SAS 1.1	SCSI Ultra-160; SAS 1.1	SCSI Ultra-160	SCSI Ultra-160
Memory buffer	128 MB	128 MB	64 MB	64 MB
Tape speed	4.37 m/s	4.21 m/s	4.21 m/s	4.37 m/s
Hard read error rate	10^{−17}	10^{−17}	10^{−17}	10^{−17}

== Other Tandberg companies ==
For other Tandberg companies see Tandberg (disambiguation)#Companies

- Tandbergs Radiofabrikk (1933–1978, bankrupt) – The original Tandberg company.
- Tandberg (1978–2010, acquired by Cisco) – Focused on consumer electronics, later video conferencing.
- Tandberg Storage – The storage research and development company spun off from Tandberg Data and later reacquired.
- O-Mass – O-Mass AS was a research and development subsidiary responsible for the development of a new read-write head technology, that could allow tape sizes to reach 10 terabytes. A conceptual 2 TB demonstration was produced. Tandberg Storage owned 93.5%, while Imation of the United States held 6.5% of the company. Three people worked for O-Mass.
