= Edda radiofabrikk =

Former Norwegian radio manufacturer

- Company type: Aksjeselskap
- Industry: Electronics
- Founded: 1939
- Defunct: 1964
- Fate: Wound down
- Headquarters: Trondheim, Norway
- Key people: Sverre Lund
- Products: Radios, radiograms, television sets

Edda radiofabrikk (Norwegian for "Edda Radio Factory") was an electronics company in Trondheim. The firm was founded in 1939 by the diploma engineer Sverre Lund. The factory was closed in 1964.

== Founding ==
Sverre Lund, from Sulitjelma, took his diploma in the electrical division at the Norwegian Institute of Technology (NTH, now NTNU) in 1931, the year after Vebjørn Tandberg, whom he knew from the gymnasium in Bodø. Lund worked for a year at Salve Staubos Radiofabrikk (Høvding) in Oslo.

In 1938 Lund decided to start his own radio factory in Trondheim. He brought in several local industrialists with NTH backgrounds, such as Ingemann Torp and Eilert Fjeldseth, the physician and industrialist Olav Usland, and a number of smaller shareholders. He also obtained a guarantee from Trondheim municipality that it would, if necessary, contribute up to 20,000 kroner in share capital to reach the required 90,000, justified by the importance of building industry in the city on expertise from the college community, though it is uncertain whether the municipality needed to come in as an owner.

== Production and the war years ==
The factory got going in October 1939 with production of the Edda-superen in premises at Erling Skakkes gate 3. At the occupation of 9 April 1940, 50 finished sets are said to have been in stock, but they were hidden in the loft and sold after the war, and only some special sets, ordered by the armed forces for Gardermoen, were seized by the Germans.

During the Second World War, Lund and colleagues were set to produce a special radio for the Gestapo chief Gerhard Flesch, but they are said to have managed to delay the building so much that it was never finished. Instead they built, among other things, emergency safety devices and repaired illegal radios, and Lund invented a type of electric fence. He left Edda in 1950 and started the firm Elektromekanikk in Stjørdal to produce this and other products, such as measuring instruments for dairies.

Before he left, Sverre Lund managed to design the radio models Veslemøy and Haugtussa, of which over 5,000 are said to have been produced a year between 1946 and 1949. The factory then had up to 90 employees and had taken over an old factory at Elgesetergata 2, previously Trondhjems Skofabrikk between 1899 and 1940, among other uses.

Under new management, including the chief engineer Thorleif Foss, the factory expanded with new models, among them radiograms. Radio demand held up through the 1950s, and 70 percent of production was sold "south of the mountains," as Adresseavisen put it in February 1955. There were then 55 employees in the factory, 40 of them in assembly, of whom about 25 were women, while production of wooden cabinets was outsourced to subcontractors.

Ahead of the start of regular television broadcasts in Norway in 1960, Edda also began producing television sets, with a dedicated department set up to produce up to ten sets a day. At the same time, production of travel radios increased, which also saw a significant export.

== Closure ==
Competition in the television market was hard, however, both from Tandberg radiofabrikk and Radionette, which invested in large-scale production in the Oslo area, and from foreign brands. The fact that people bought televisions rather than radios and radiograms also led to a decline in that part of the factory, and each television set was moreover far more costly and technically demanding to produce than radios.

The margins were small, and profitability at Edda fell, so production was gradually scaled down: employees who left were not replaced, and the stocks were quietly emptied. In September 1964 Adresseavisen reported what most had already noticed, that the radio and television factory in Elgesetergata was in reality closed. The company lived on for several years with some sales and service, but with only a few employees and no production.
