= Tape head =

Component used for magnetic tape playback and recording

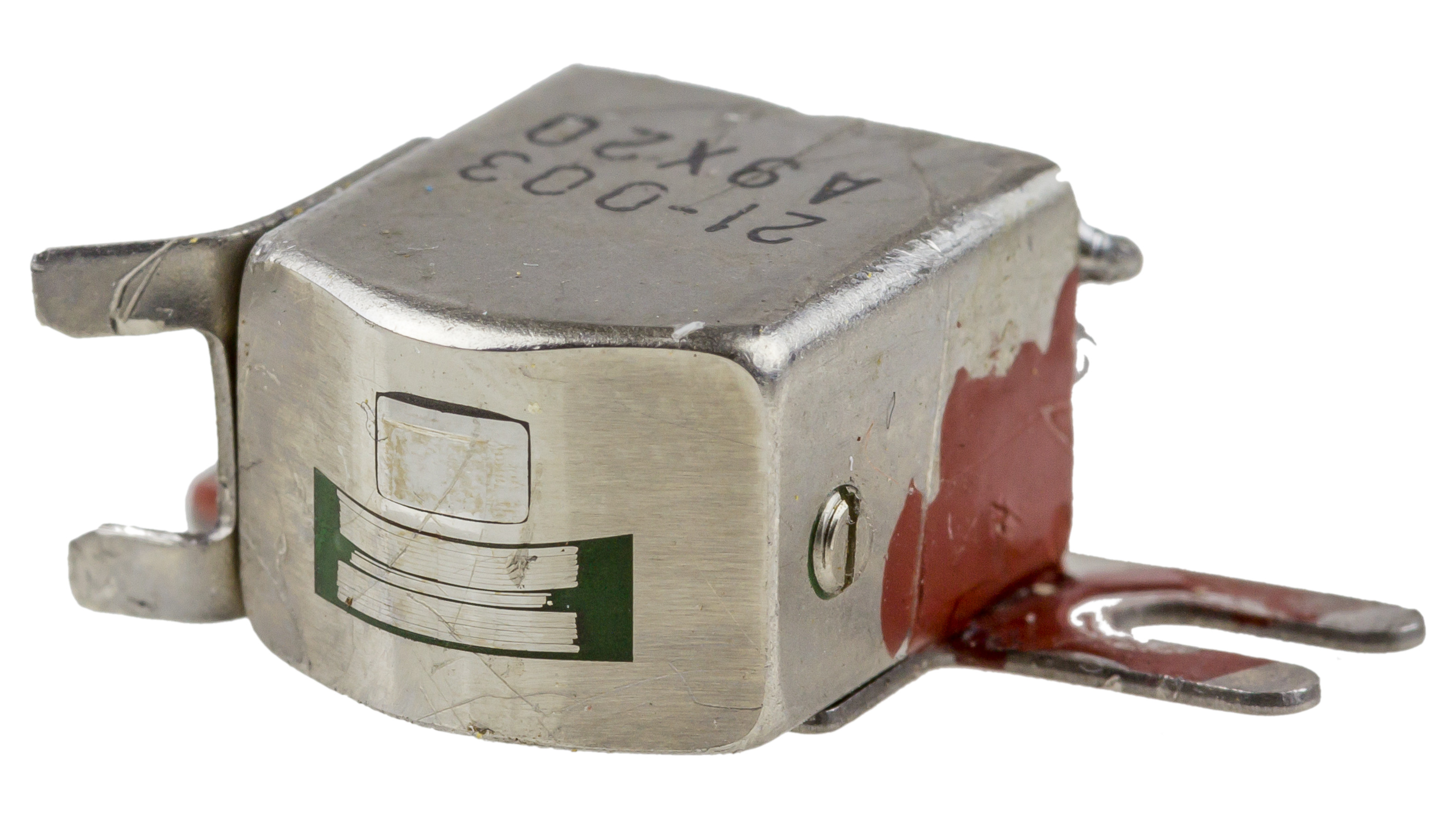
Tape head assembly from a compact cassette deck. The compact cassette uses four tracks, two for each side; visible are two heads (the silver rectangles inside the black rectangle) for playing one side of the tape at a time.

A tape head is a type of transducer used in tape recorders to convert electrical signals to magnetic fluctuations and vice versa. Cassette tapes, reel-to-reel tapes, 8-track tapes, VHS tapes, and even floppy disks and early hard disk drives all use the same principle of physics to store and read back information. The medium is magnetized in a pattern. For playback, the recorded medium passes across the head; the moving tape’s magnetic field varies with respect to the head, inducing a varying electric current in the head. That voltage can then be amplified and connected to speakers in the case of audio, or measured and sorted into ones and zeroes in the case of digital data.

== Principles of operation ==
The electromagnetic arrangement of a tape head is generally similar for all types, though the physical design varies considerably depending on the application. For example, videocassette recorders (VCR) use rotating heads to produce a helical scan, whereas most audio recorders have fixed heads. A head consists of a core of magnetic material arranged into a doughnut shape or toroid, into which a very narrow gap has been let. This gap is filled with a diamagnetic material, such as gold. This forces the magnetic flux out of the gap into the magnetic tape medium more than air would, and also forces the magnetic flux out of the magnetic tape medium into the gap. The flux thus magnetises the tape or induces current in the coil at that point. A coil of wire wrapped around the core opposite the gap interfaces to the electrical side of the apparatus. The basic head design is fully reversible: a variable magnetic field at the gap will induce an electric current in the coil, and an electric current in the coil will induce a magnetic field at the gap.

=== Reversibility ===
While a head is reversible in principle, and very often in practice, there are desirable characteristics that differ between the playback and recording phases. One of these is the impedance of the coil, with playback preferring a high impedance, and recording a low one. In the very best tape recorders, separate heads are used to avoid compromising these desirable characteristics. Having separate heads for recording and playback has other advantages, such as off-tape monitoring during recording.

=== Head gap width ===
The width of the head gap is also critical: the narrower the gap, the better the head will be. A narrow head gap gives much better transcription in the magnetic domain (which equals to more output with high-frequency signals in the case with playback heads). The desirability for a narrow gap means that most practical heads are made by forming a narrow V-shaped groove in the back face of the core, and grinding away the front face until the V-groove is just breached. In this way, gaps of the order of micrometres are achievable.

A recording head, on the other hand, has a gap typically six times larger than that of the replay head; this gives a larger flux to magnetise the tape. The ideal gap size in a cassette deck are: wide record head gap and narrow playback head. The larger gap does not affect frequency response because the 'image' is largely made by the trailing edge of the gap. A combined record/playback head has a compromise size gap, typically three times that of a playback-only head.

There are also negative aspects of narrow head gaps, particularly for magnetic recording. The narrower the head gap, the more bias signal must be used to maintain linearity of the signal on tape, which in turn will reduce the high-frequency headroom or SOL (Saturated Output Level), particularly with slower tape speeds. Manufacturers must find a compromise between intended tape speeds and head gaps for this reason.

== Types ==
The physical design of a head depends on whether it is fixed or rotating. In either case, the face of the head where the gap is must be made hard wearing and highly smooth to avoid excessive head wear. It can also be seen that due to the construction method of the head gap, head wear will tend to widen the gap, reducing the head's performance over time. The vertical alignment of the heads (the azimuth) must also match between recording and playback for good fidelity, and the gap should be as close to exactly vertical as possible for highest frequency response. Most tape transport mechanisms will allow fine mechanical adjustment of the azimuth of the heads. Sometimes this can be achieved by automatic circuitry - the actual mechanical azimuth adjustment being carried out by taking advantage of the piezo effect of certain types of crystal material.

=== Rotating heads ===
Rotating heads, as used in video recorders, digital audio tape and other applications, are used to achieve a high relative head–to–tape speed while maintaining a low overall tape transport speed. One or more transducers are mounted on a rotating drum set at an angle to the tape. The drum spins rapidly compared to the speed at which the tape moves past it, so that the transducers describe a path of stripes across the tape, rather than linearly along it as a fixed head does. The wear characteristics of such helical scan heads are even more critical, and highly polished heads and tapes are required. The electrical signals of rotating heads are coupled either inductively or capacitively, with no direct electrical connection to the head coils.

=== Erase heads ===
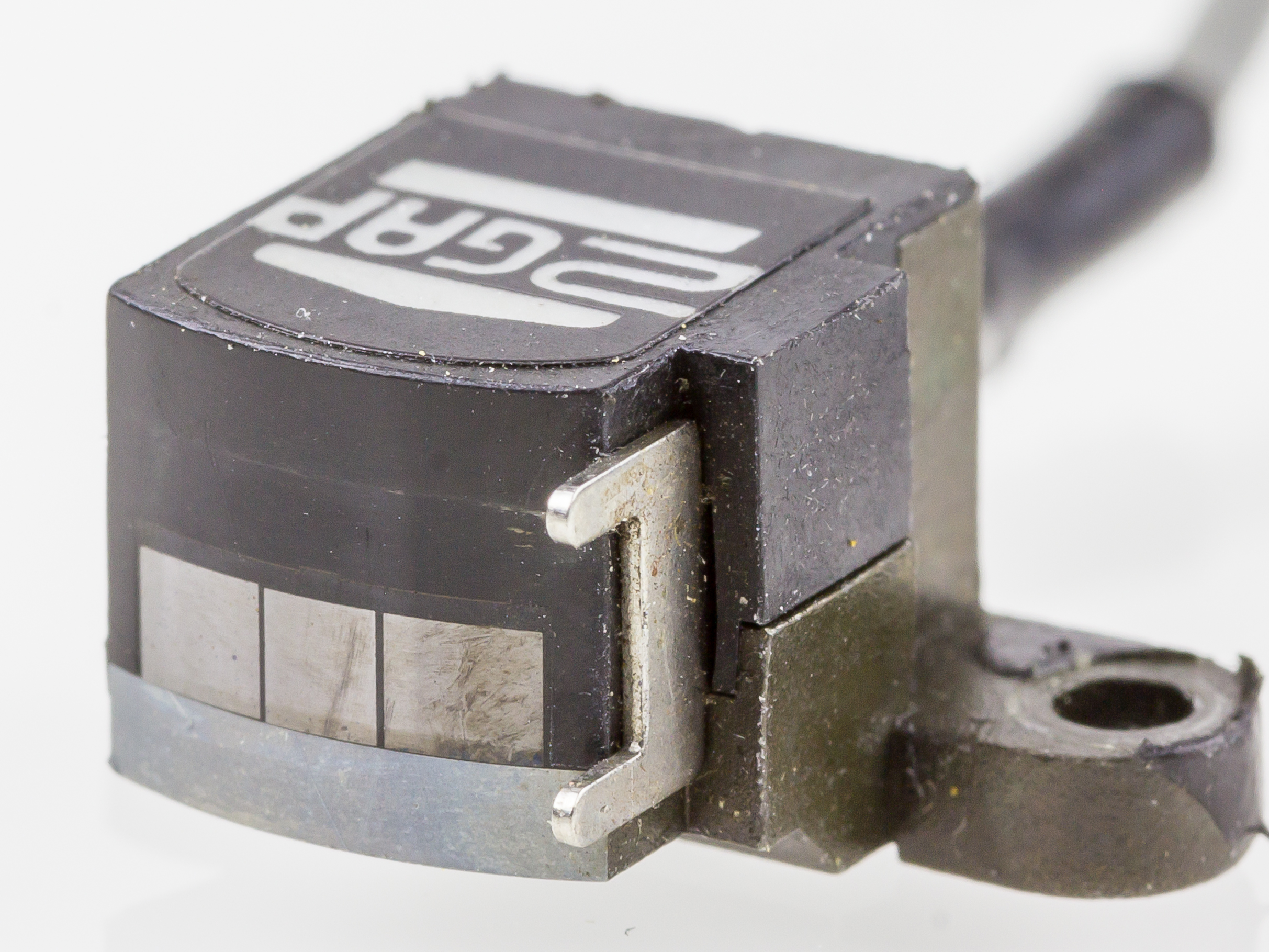
Erase head

An erase head is constructed in a similar manner to a record or replay head, but has a much larger gap, or more frequently, two large gaps. The erase head is powered during recording from a high-frequency source (usually the same oscillator that provides the AC bias). In some inexpensive cassette recorder designs, the erase head is a permanent magnet that is mechanically moved into contact with the moving tape only during recording. Permanent magnet erase heads are also sometimes used in machines that are equipped with DC bias.

=== Recording heads ===
A recording head is the physical interface between a recording apparatus and a moving recording medium. Recording heads are generally classified according to the physical principle that allows them to impress their data upon their medium. A recording head is often mechanically paired with a playback head, which, though proximal to, is often discrete from the record head.

Magnetic recording heads use the principles of electromagnetism to coerce a paramagnetic recording medium, such as iron oxides, to orient in a magnetic storage medium such as magnetic tape, floppy disk or hard disk. Record heads are constructed of laminated permalloy, ferrite, sendust or magnetoresistive materials. Tape heads and hard disk drive heads are today generally some form of magnetoresistive head

=== Cross-field heads ===
Instead of feeding both the bias signal and the audio signal into the same recording head, a few brands of audio tape recorder, notably Tandberg, Akai and its US cousin Roberts, used a separate bias head on the opposite side of the tape from the recording head; this system was termed cross-field.

=== Head materials ===
Record and replay heads are traditionally made of soft iron (the softness is an essential requisite for good record and replay characteristics). This material features extremely good electro-acoustical properties, but wears away fairly rapidly with a consequent deterioration of performance. Some higher-end recorders featured heads made from ferrite, which features excellent electro-acoustical properties while being a very hard material that resists wear. Its two main disadvantages are that it is brittle and easily damaged, and that it has a much higher noise output due to the Barkhausen effect. In more recent years, more exotic materials have appeared, some involving ceramics, which offer the best of both traditional materials.

== Cleaning ==
With use the head will become dirty with loose tape shedding, and distort the sound. The tape head can be cleaned using a cloth with alcohol. Video head cleaner can be used to clean video, audio, erase, or control track heads.

== Gallery ==
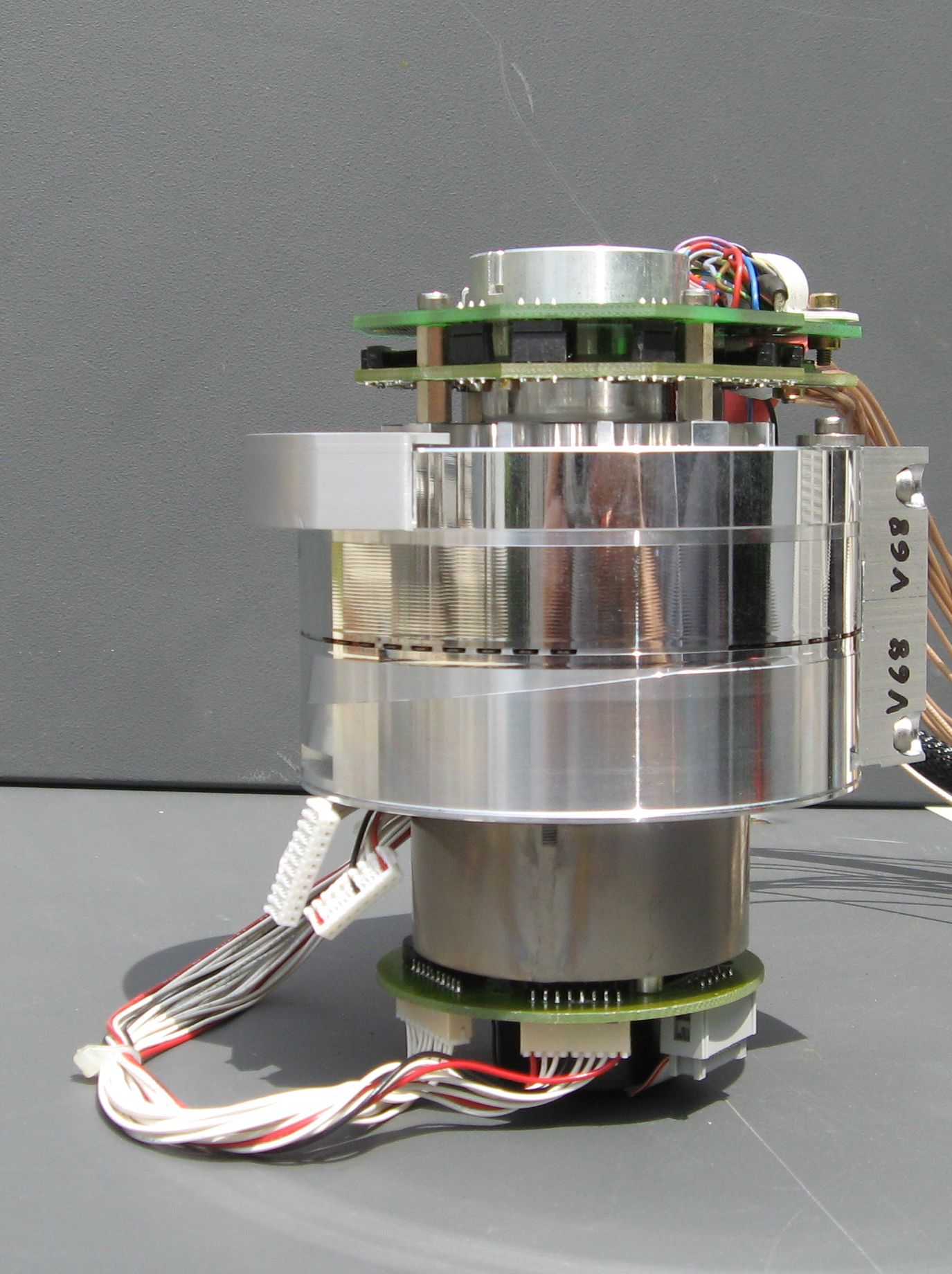
D6 HDTV VTR Scanner and video head, removed

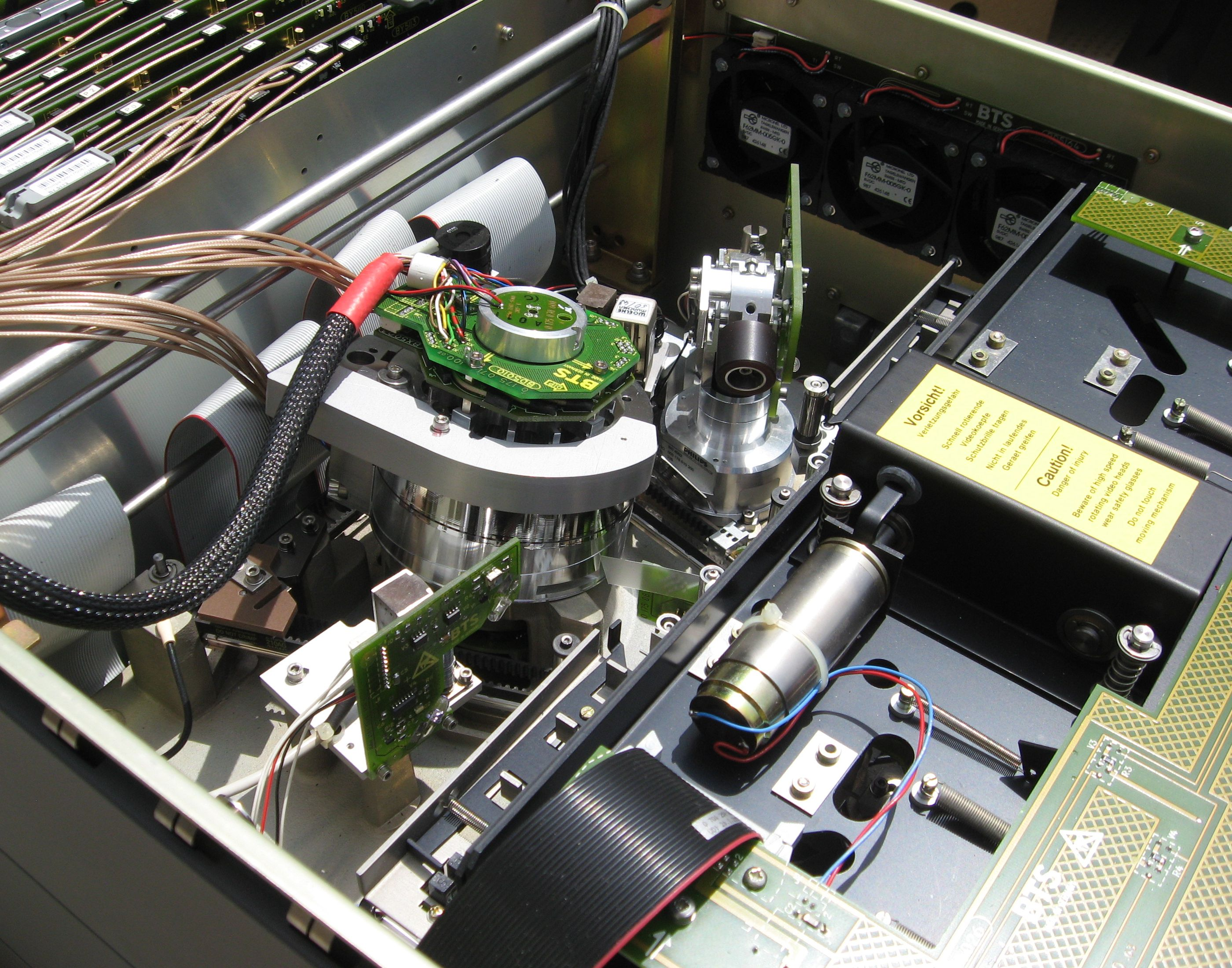
Inside a D6 HDTV VTR Tape Deck, VTR Scanner and video head in place.

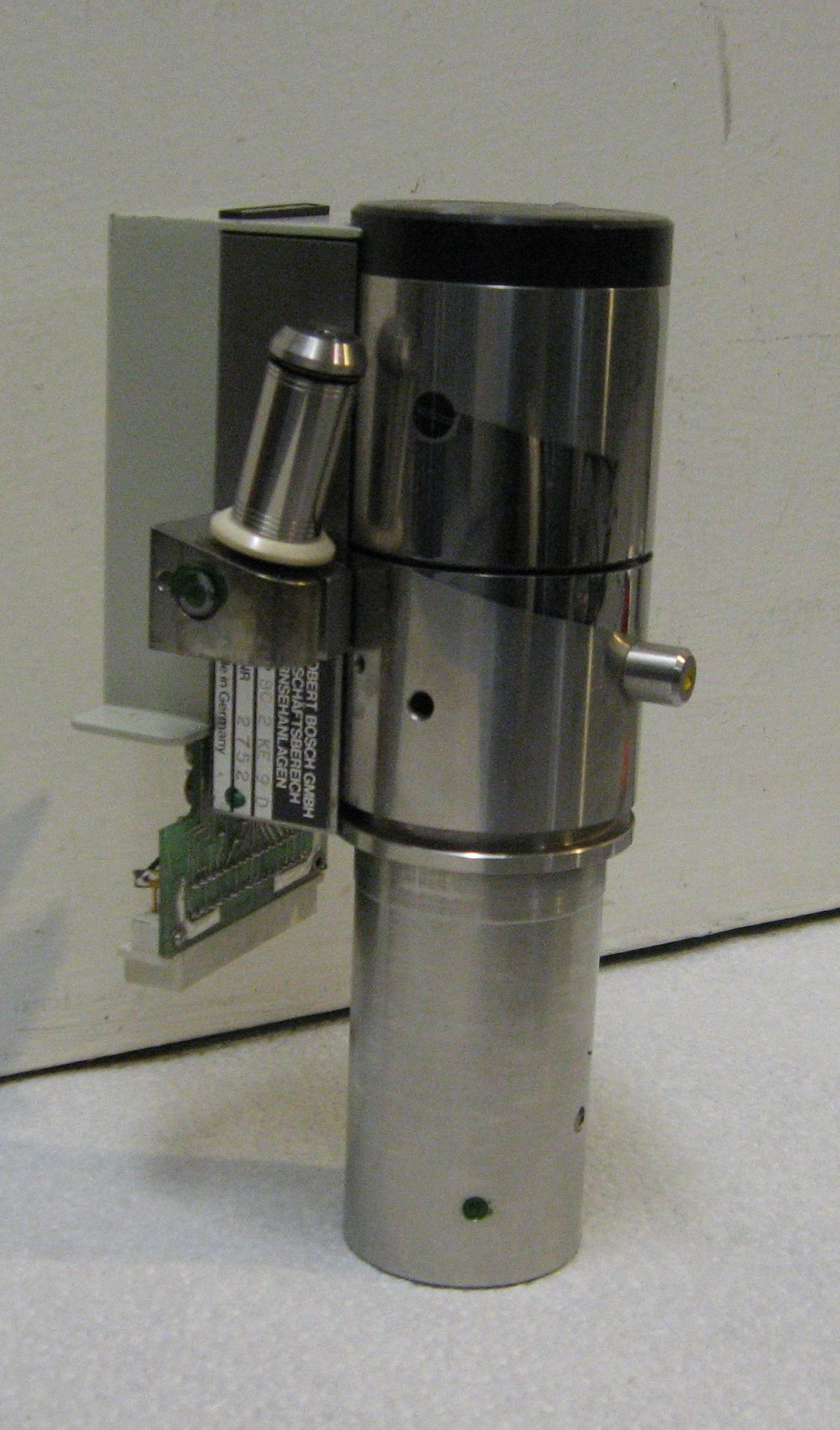
Type B videotape video Scanner Head

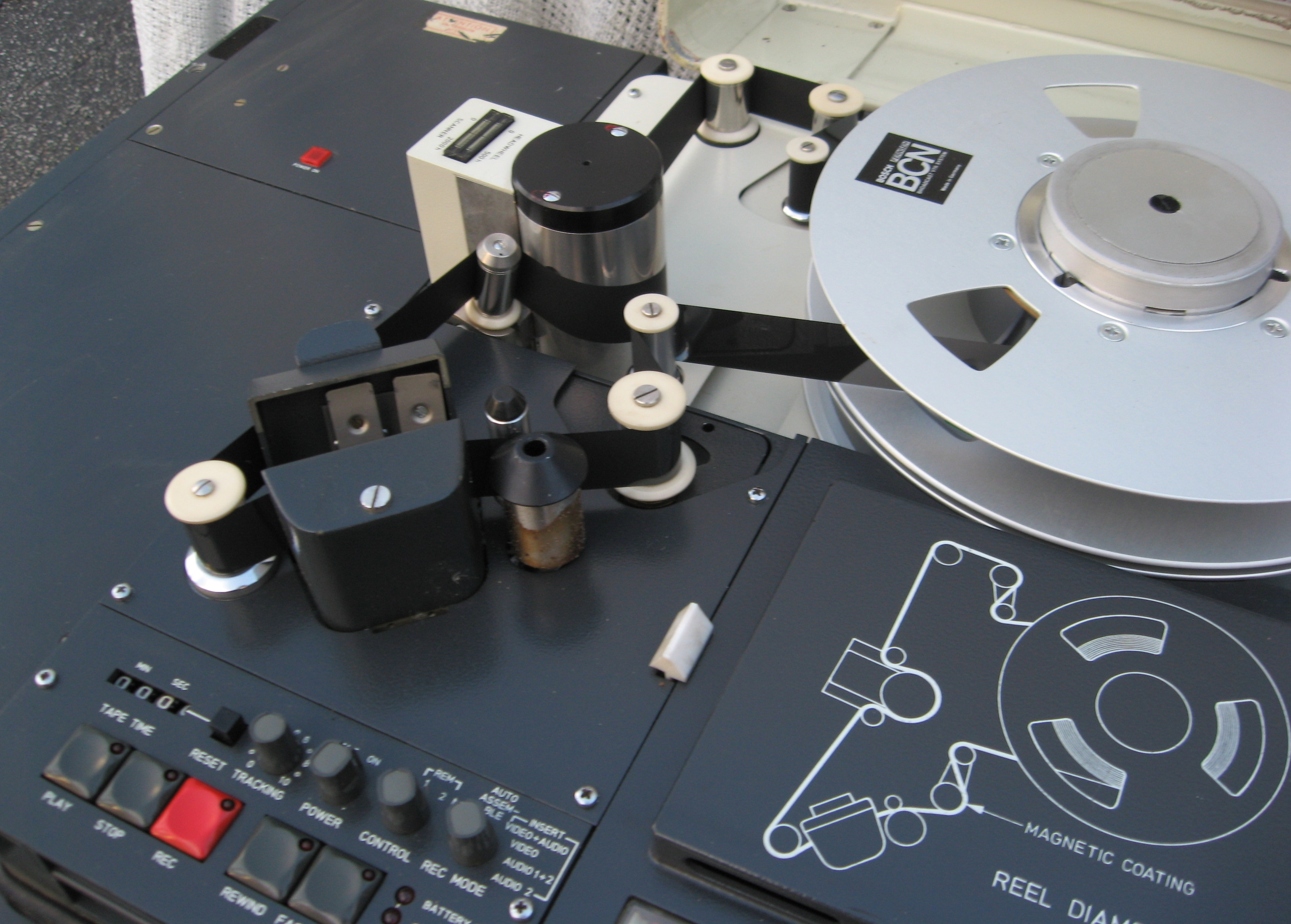
Type B VTR, BCN 20 Tape Desk and video Scanner

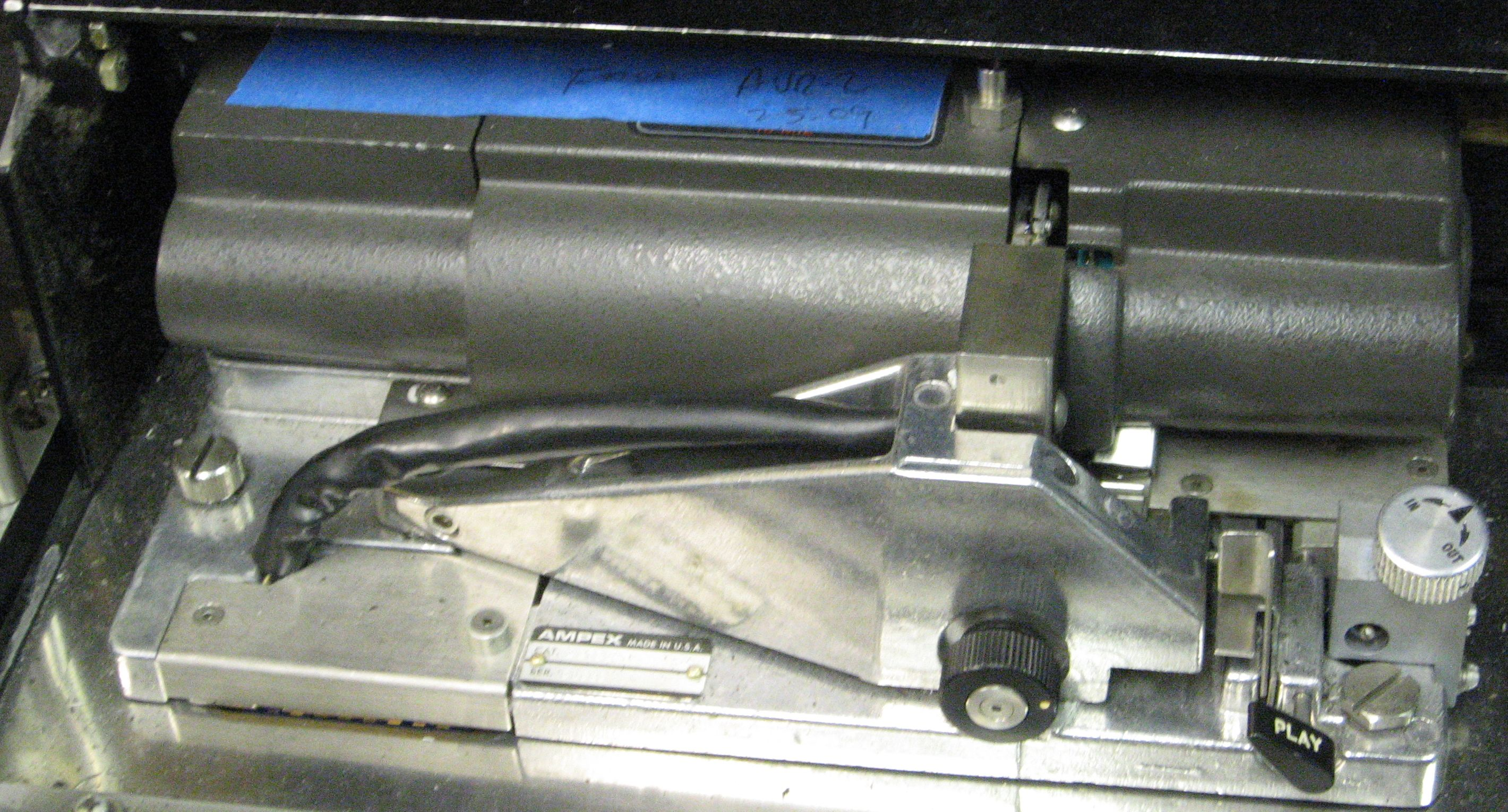
Quadruplex videotape Ampex AVR-2 Video Head

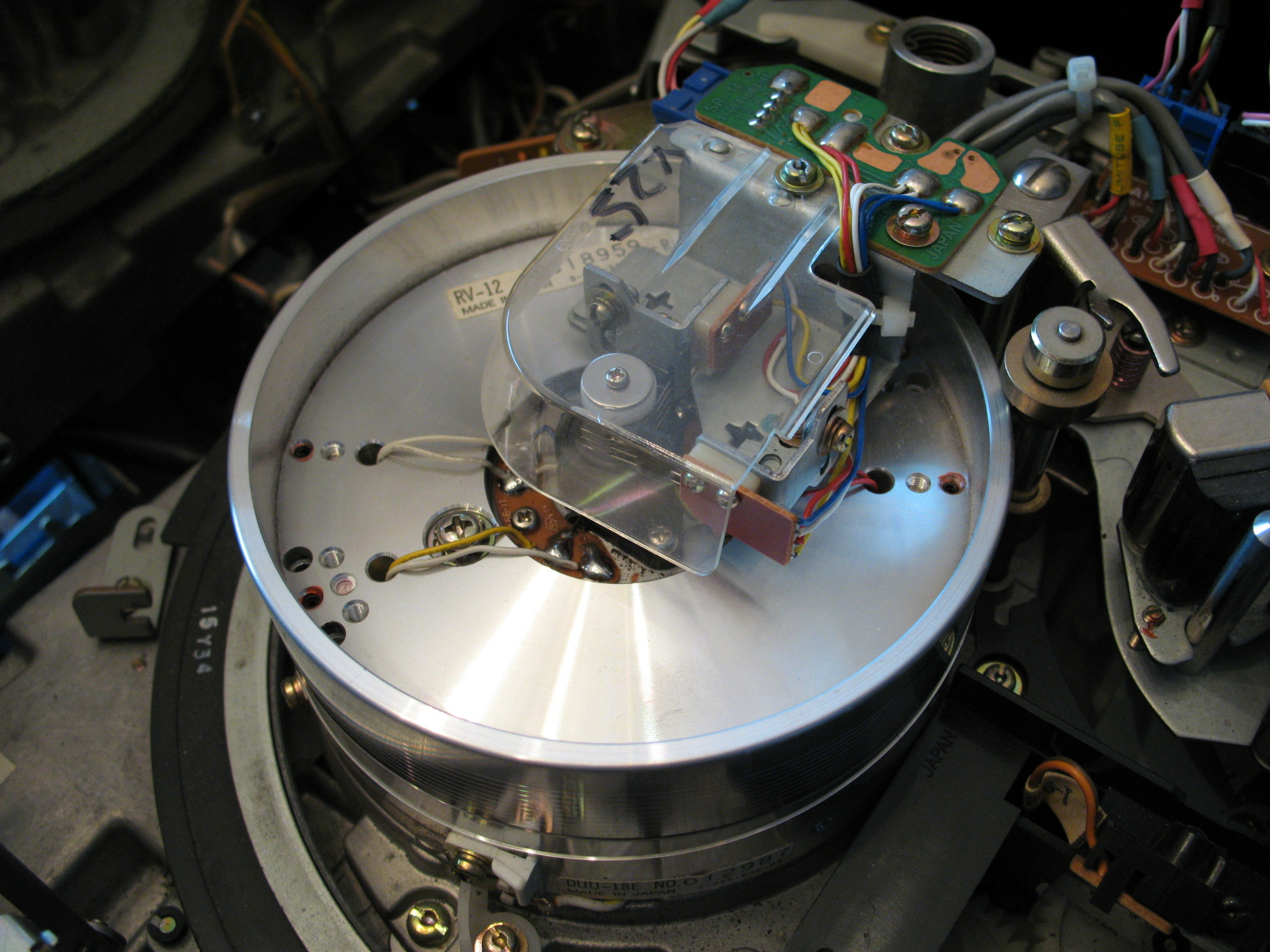
Sony U-Matic Video head

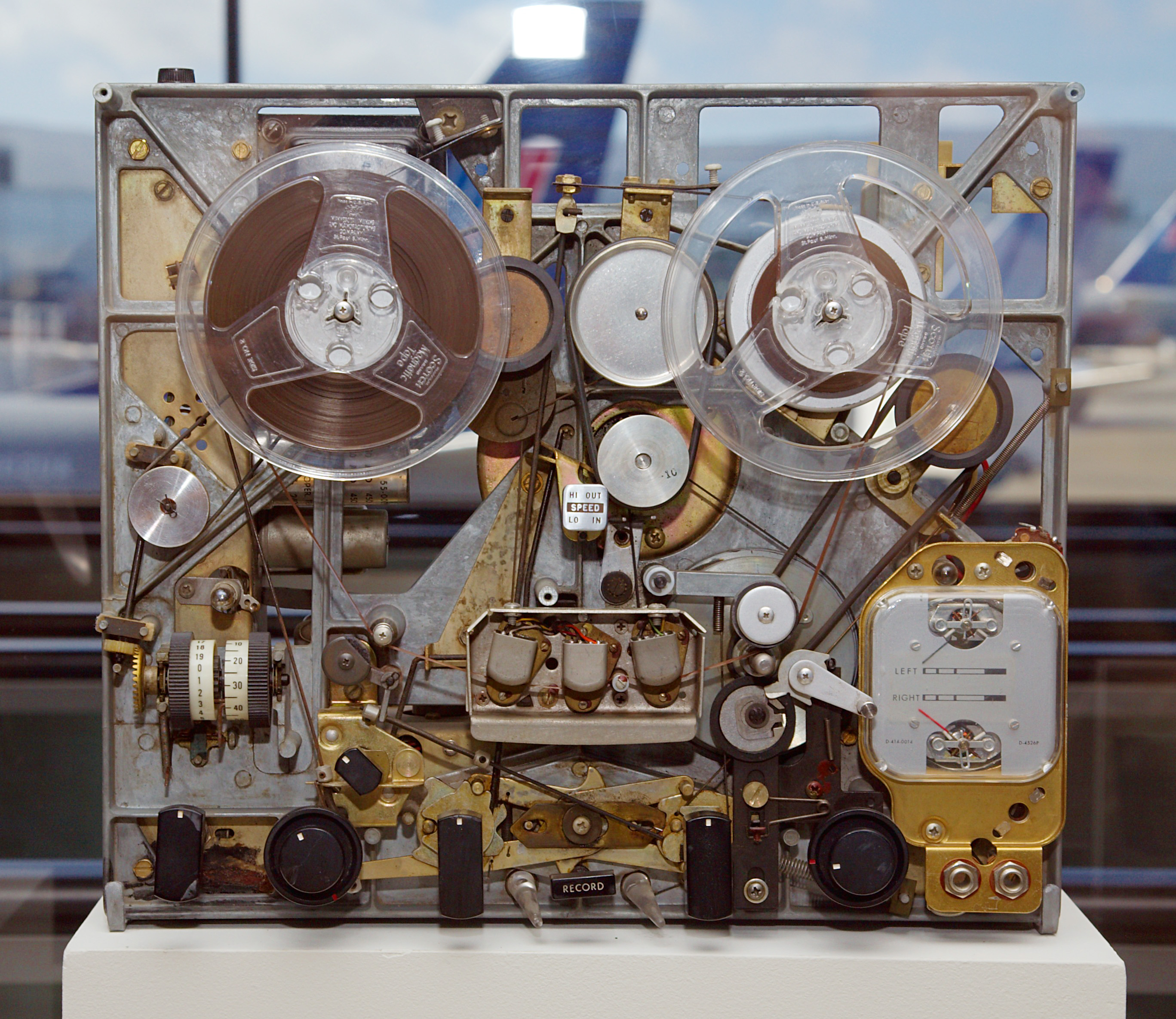
Ampex audio recorder without covers

VHS heads

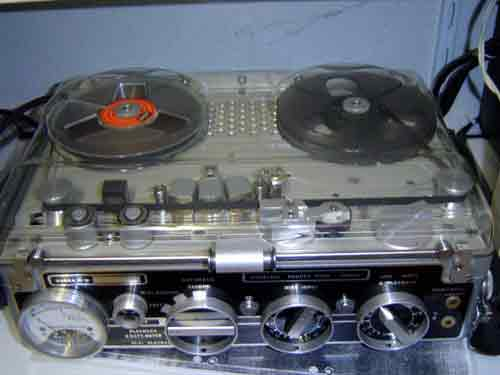
Nagra audio heads: erase, record and play

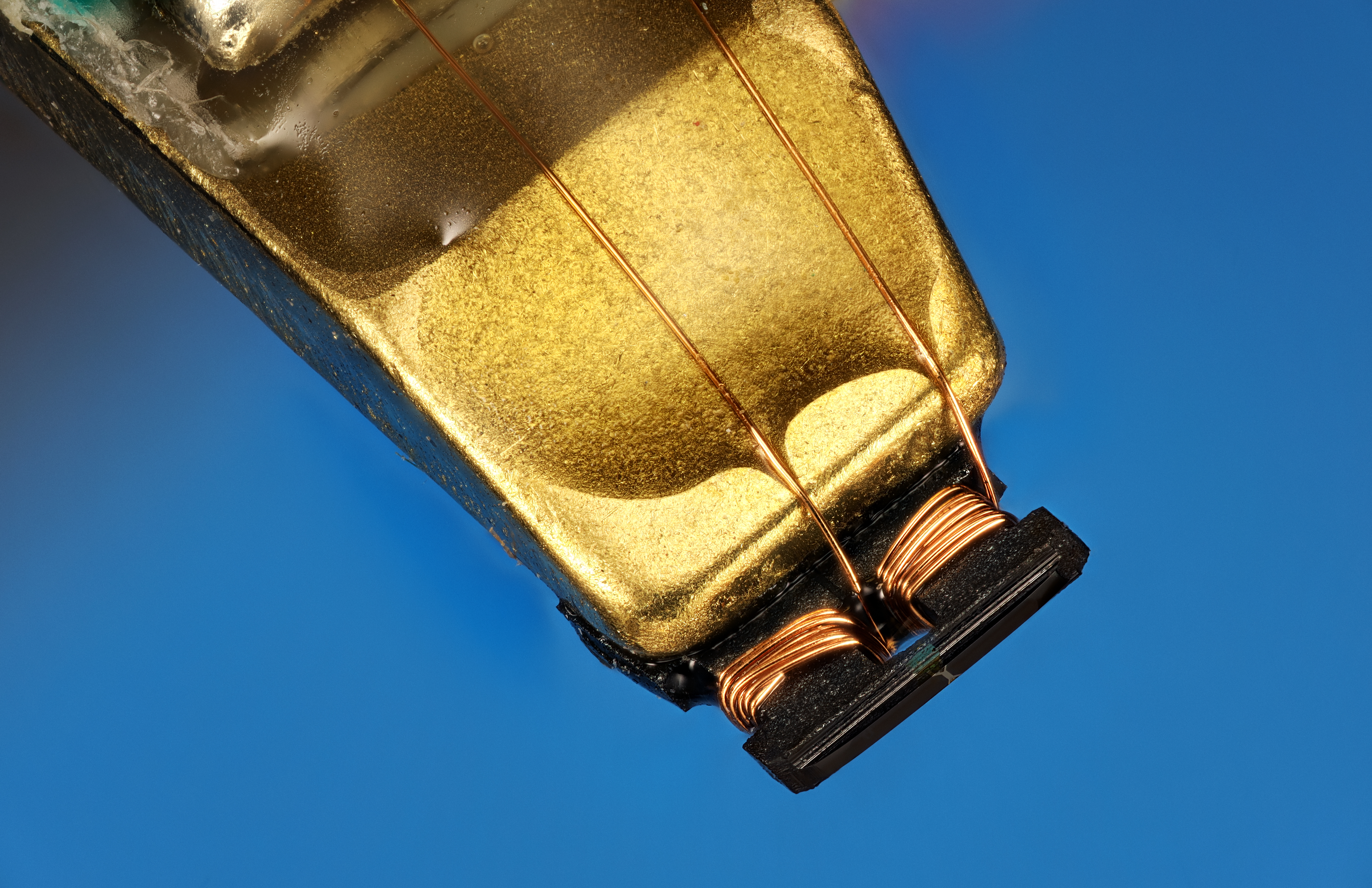
SONY UVW-1400P_1400AP Betacam SP video heads

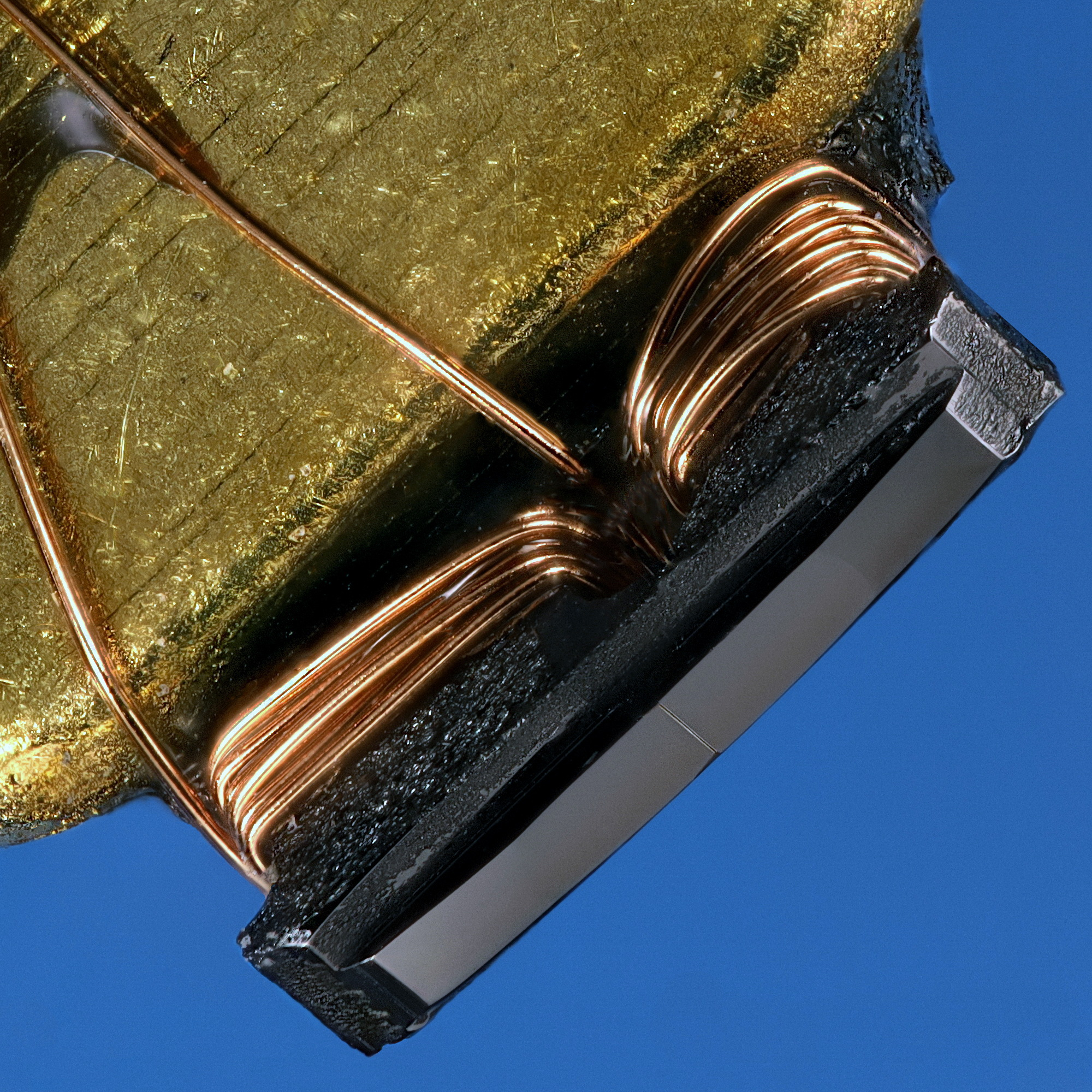
Sony UVW-1800P Betacam SP flying erase head

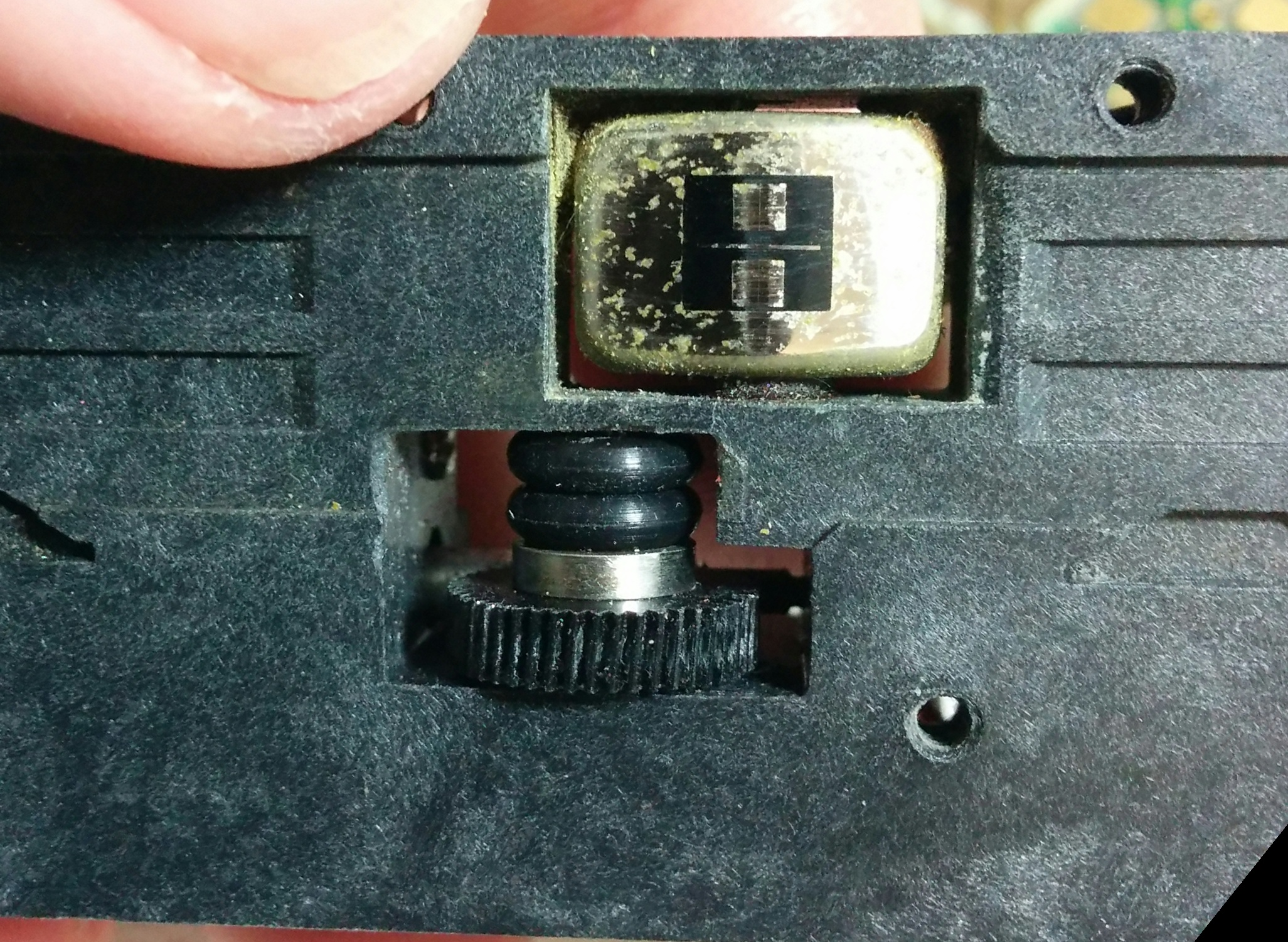
Magnetic card reader of a programmable pocket calculator HP-67 (1976) with transport mechanism

== See also ==
- Magnetic tape sound recording
