= Tandberg C90 =

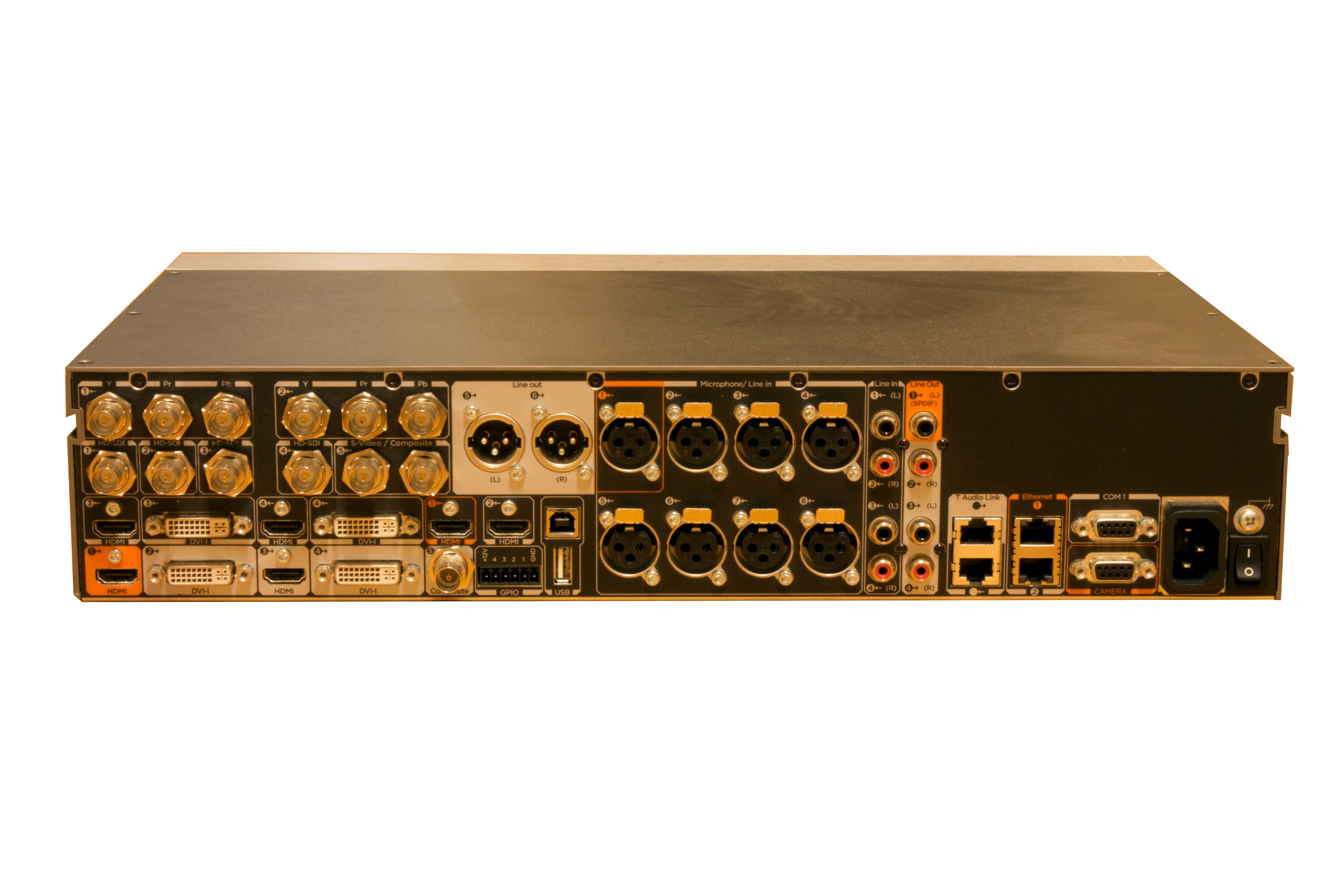
- Manufacturer: Tandberg
- Availability by region: October 2008
- Dimensions: Length: 17.36"/44.1 cm Height: 3.67"/9.3 cm Depth: 11.8"/30 cm
- Weight: 11.22 lbs/5.1 kg
- Rear camera: Not included. Maximum live video resolutions: 1920×1080@30fps and 1280×720@60fps
- Display: Not included. Outputs supported: HDMI, DVI-I, BNC (PAL/NTSC)
- Connectivity: 2 × separate LAN/Ethernet (RJ-45) 10/100/1000 Mbit; 13 video inputs (up to 1080p60); 5 video outputs (up to 1080p60); 14 audio inputs 8 audio outputs

The Tandberg C90 is a videoconferencing codec and telepresence engine produced by the Norwegian company Tandberg. It is used as the basis for Tandberg's telepresence solutions T1 and T3.

The C90 was announced in June 2008, and started shipping in October. In addition to being a telepresence engine, the C90 is available as a stand-alone product, mostly targeted at auditoriums, boardrooms, and large meeting rooms. The C90 supports both H.323 and SIP, and uses H.263, H.263+, and H.264 for video.

The Tandberg C90 was recognized as the "Most Innovative Audio/Video Conferencing Product" at the AV awards ceremonies at InfoComm 09.
