= Magnet Kitchens =

Furniture retailer based in Northern England

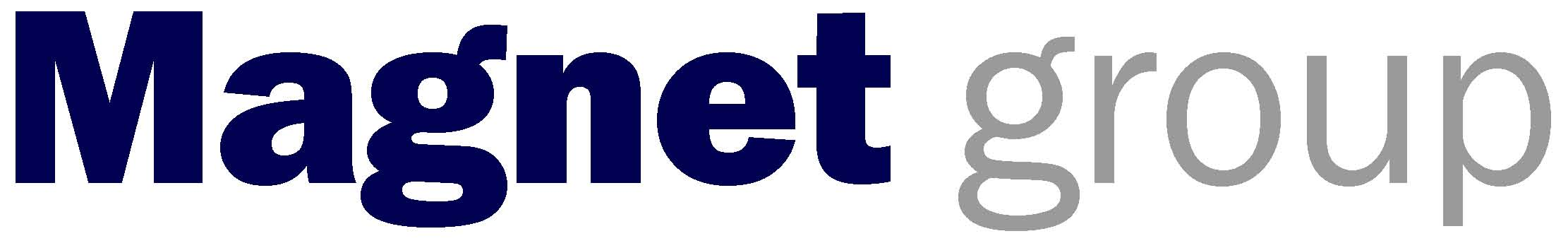
- The current logo (2021)
- Industry: Retailer
- Founded: Bingley, England (1918)
- Founder: Tom Duxbury
- Headquarters: Darlington, England
- Number of locations: 196 stores (21 February 2023)
- Area served: United Kingdom, Isle of Man, Jersey, Guernsey
- Products: Kitchens, Joinery
- Owner: Nobia AB
- Number of employees: c2,000
- Website: magnet.co.uk magnettrade.co.uk magnetprojects.co.uk

Magnet is a British kitchen retailer operating in over two hundred locations across the United Kingdom supplying products under the Magnet and Magnet Trade brands.

Magnet was listed on the London Stock Exchange, and was once a constituent of the FTSE 100 Index, and became part of Nobia UK, a division of the Nobia group which is listed on the Swedish Stock Exchange. The Nobia division also includes the brands Gower and Norema.

== History ==
Magnet was established in Bingley, West Yorkshire in 1918.

It opened its first retail kitchen showrooms in 1985. In March 1989, Magnet sold the Southern-Evans timber business in preparation for a £629m management buy out which took place the following year.

After a significant downturn in sales. Magnet was unable to pay its bankers. In 1989, Tom Duxbury led a management buyout of the business. The buyout failed quite quickly and the banks took control of the business.

In 1990, separate Retail and Trade divisions were established to maximise customer service for these very different market sectors. Factories in Easthams, Thornton, Burnley, Deeside, Gillingham and Lincoln were closed, with work transferred to Darlington and Keighley. In March 1994, Berisford acquired the company.

The company's financial performance stabilised. It had a lack of investment and a long running industrial dispute.

In April 2001, Magnet was acquired by Nobia, a Swedish-based kitchen company for £134m. Significant investments were made in the company, with a multimillion-pound showroom refurbishment programme and the introduction of the Trade Concept, an initiative to grow the company's market share in the trade channel. To support the increased demand for Magnet products, further investment was made in the Darlington site converting the manufacturing operation into a modern assemble to order facility.

In 2003, Magnet's retail showroom concept won Best UK Retail Interior by Retail Interiors Magazine, and has subsequently refurbished the majority of its estate in line with this footprint. Magnet was the first national kitchen retailer to achieve Trustmark accreditation, a scheme designed to drive out the cowboys in the home improvement sector.

== See also ==
- Nobia
