= Cross-field head =

Additional tape recorder tape head to improve performance

A cross-field head, sometimes referred to as X-field, is an additional recording head in a tape recorder that improves the ability to record high-frequency sounds. The concept was first introduced by Tandberg in their TB-6X 1960s, and more widely used by Akai and their US brand, Roberts.

== Bias and self-erasure ==
A conventional tape recorder uses two heads. The main head is used for both playback and recording. A second head, placed before the main head in terms of the direction of tape movement, is used during recording to erase any previous signal. Additionally, the record head is used to introduce a tape bias signal that improves frequency response.

Generally, lower frequencies are recorded lower in the oxide layer on the tape. In order to get the bias signal into these layers, the signal has to be fairly strong, stronger than what would be needed to write higher frequencies alone. This means there is some stray signal, both from the bias and new high frequency signals being recorded, that "leaks out" of the immediate area of the recording and into the nearby tape. For low frequencies this has no effect because the layer they are recorded in is far from the record head, but for high frequencies it is possible to self-erase a signal just laid down.

This problem is primarily seen at slower tape transport. If the tape is moving at high speed, the previously recorded sounds will quickly move away from the record head and avoid self-erasure. At slower speeds there isn't enough time for this to happen.

== Cross-field ==
Cross-field recording adds a second head to record the bias signal separately from the signal. It is placed on the "back" of the tape, directly across from the recording head. Since the bias has to reach the deepest layers of the oxide, placing the head on the back of the tape means that reaching these levels does not require it to penetrate right to the front of the tape. This helps reduce self-erasure due to the bias signal.

Additionally, the heads are arranged so the combination of the two signals results in a small "dead zone" directly past the recording head where high frequency signals are blanked out. This prevents subsequent high frequency signals from interfering with those just recorded, by the time they exit the dead zone they are too far from the head to be overwritten.

Although the two-head solution was the first and most common type of cross-field system, there were several other systems of varying complexity and capability. Akai reel-to-reel systems using cross-field, starting with the Akai XIV/Roberts 770, boasted 13 kHz maximum frequency at 1.875 inches per second, greater than similar systems at twice that speed.

The two-head cross-field system also had problems. One was the need to keep the heads in proper alignment, which was tricky for the average user. Additionally, dirt on the tape of record head that lifted the tape away from the record head pushed it closer to the bias head, re-introducing the self-erasure problem. For proper results, cross-field recording needed high quality tapes, to ensure the oxide layer was thick enough to allow the bias signal to imprint on the deeper levels of the oxide without reaching the front surface.
