= Jan Wessel =

Norwegian radio engineer (1903–1980)

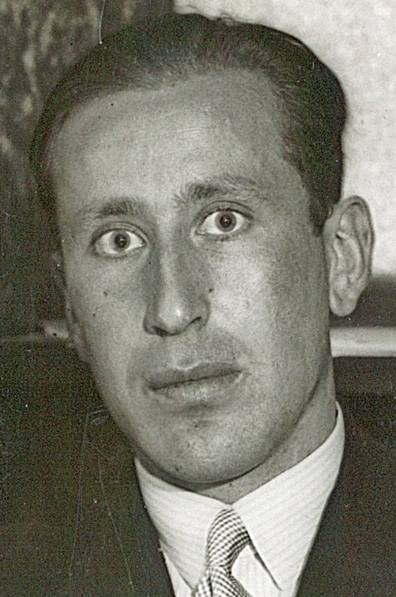
- Born: 16 November 1903
- Died: 12 August 1980
- Occupation: Engineering
- Known for: Radio pioneer and industrialist

Jan Wessel (16 November 1903 – 12 August 1980) was a Norwegian radio engineer, known for having established and operated the Norwegian production company Radionette. The company was the first in Norway to start production of radios for connection to the electrical grid.

== Biography ==
Wessel was born in Christiania (now Oslo) to operations engineer Henrik Lysholm Wessel (1861–1936) and Sophie Friederike ("Frieda") Eleonore Weidemann Goebel (1868–1959). He is great-great-great-grandson of Johan Herman Wessel (1742–1785), Ole Christopher Wessel (1744–1794) and Caspar Wessel (1745–1818).

Jan Wessel was one of the many self-taught enthusiasts who participated in the pioneering phase of the spread of radio technology in Norway. He stood out early by focusing fully on a commercial utilization of the technology through the design, production and sale of radios to a wide audience, from 1927 through the company Radionette, which grew to become one of the three major radio factories in Norway.

He developed his first radio (a 2-vacuum tube travel radio with a flashlight battery) under the name Radionette, based on German components (Ultra) assembled at his dormitory in Bygdøy in Oslo (1926).

=== Kurér ===
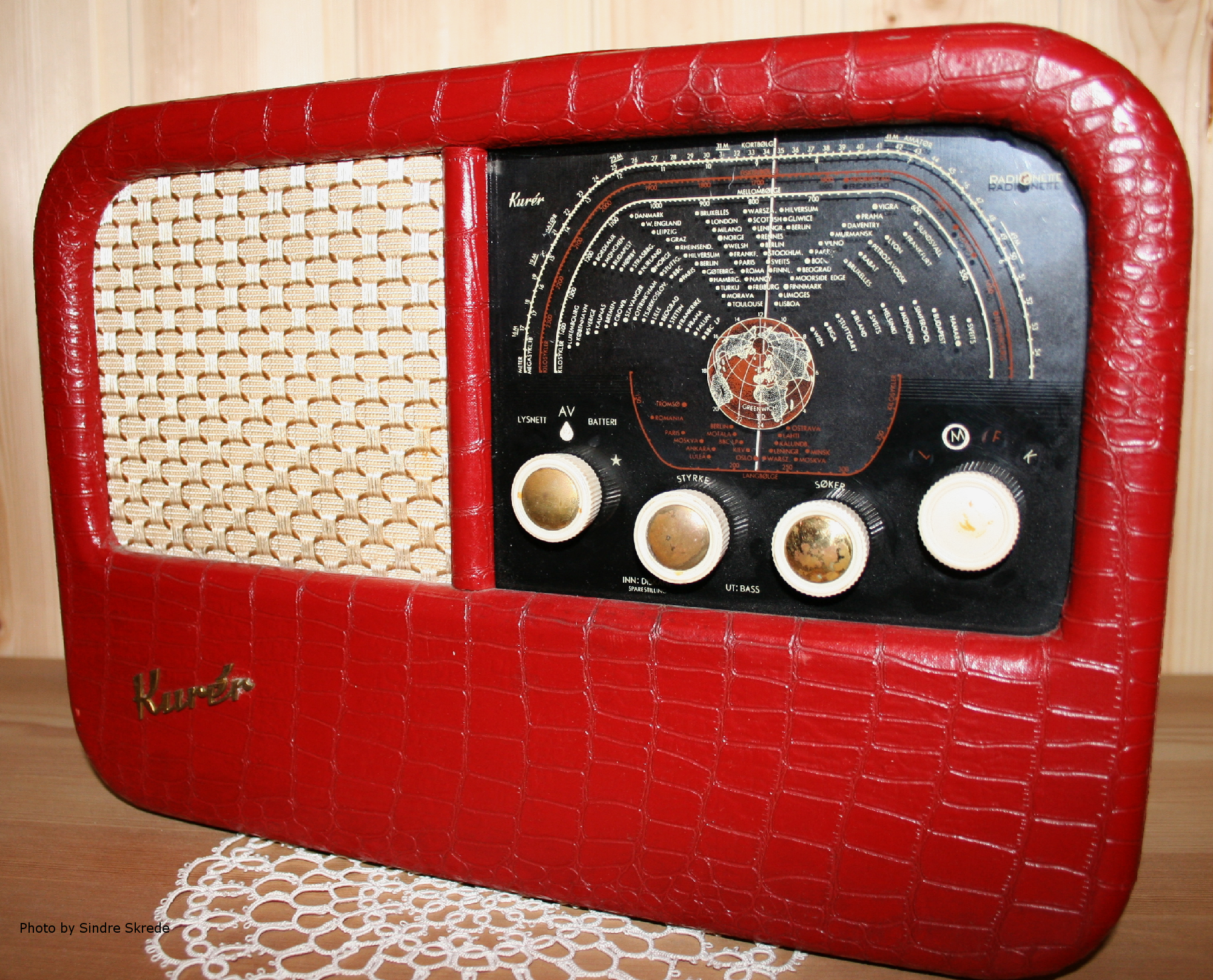
Radionette's Kurér edition no. 2, easily recognizable by its rounded corners.

After World War II, Wessel developed the portable radio Kurér. The first model was launched on April 24, 1950. The Kurér had four direct-emitted vacuum tubes and a permanent magnet speaker. It had four wave bands: long wave, medium wave, fishing wave and short wave. It was intended as a travel radio that could also be used at home and could be supplied from both the mains and a battery block with 90 V and 1.5 V voltages. The weight was 7.6 kg with the battery.

Nearly 700 copies were made of model no. 1, which would later be known as the "square courier". Model no. 2 with rounded corners was manufactured until 1958, and remains a style icon of the period. It became a great success, reaching a total of 224,000 made, and was also exported to over 60 countries, first to Thailand. Model 2 was delivered in almost 40 different colors, shades and patterns.

=== Personal relations ===
In 1937, Jan Wessel married Liv Christiansen (1908–90), and in 1945 Gudrun Graverholdt (1915–72). Jan Wessel lived in Bærum and ran the Radionette company until his retirement in 1970.

In 1968 Wessel received an Honorary Award from the Norwegian Research Council for Technical and Natural Sciences.
