= Kari Vogt =

Norwegian religious historian (1939–2024)

- Born: 3 April 1939; Oslo, Norway
- Died: 19 September 2024 (aged 85)
- Occupation: Religious historian
- Relatives: Hans Vogt (uncle); Vebjørn Tandberg (uncle)
- Awards: Fritt Ord Honorary Award (1996)

Kari Vogt (3 April 1939 – 19 September 2024) was a Norwegian religious historian. She wrote several books, and was a board member of the Norwegian Academy of Literature and Freedom of Expression, and of the Norwegian chapter of PEN International.

== Career ==
Vogt graduated in religious studies from the University of Oslo in 1965, with the thesis Urmenneskeskikkelsen i de manikeiske Thomas-salmene, and also studied in Paris. She was appointed at the University of Oslo from 1967.

Her books include Islams hus (1993), Kommet for å bli (1995), Reise i Iran (1997), and Islam på norsk (2000). She was a board member of the Norwegian Academy of Literature and Freedom of Expression and the Norwegian chapter of PEN International.

She received the Fritt Ord Honorary Award for 1996.

== Personal life and death ==
Vogt was born in Oslo to physician Erik Theodor Vogt and psychologist Bodil Therese Tandberg, and was a niece of linguist Hans Vogt and electronics engineer Vebjørn Tandberg.

Vogt died on 19 September 2024, at the age of 85.
