= Cisco TelePresence =

Cisco TelePresence, first introduced in October 2006, is a range of products developed by Cisco Systems designed to link two physically separated rooms so they resemble a single conference room, regardless of location.

Cisco documented the Telepresence concept and implementation details in the book Cisco TelePresence Fundamentals, where the difference between Telepresence and Videoconferencing, prevalent at that point in time, is defined as quality, simplicity, and reliability.

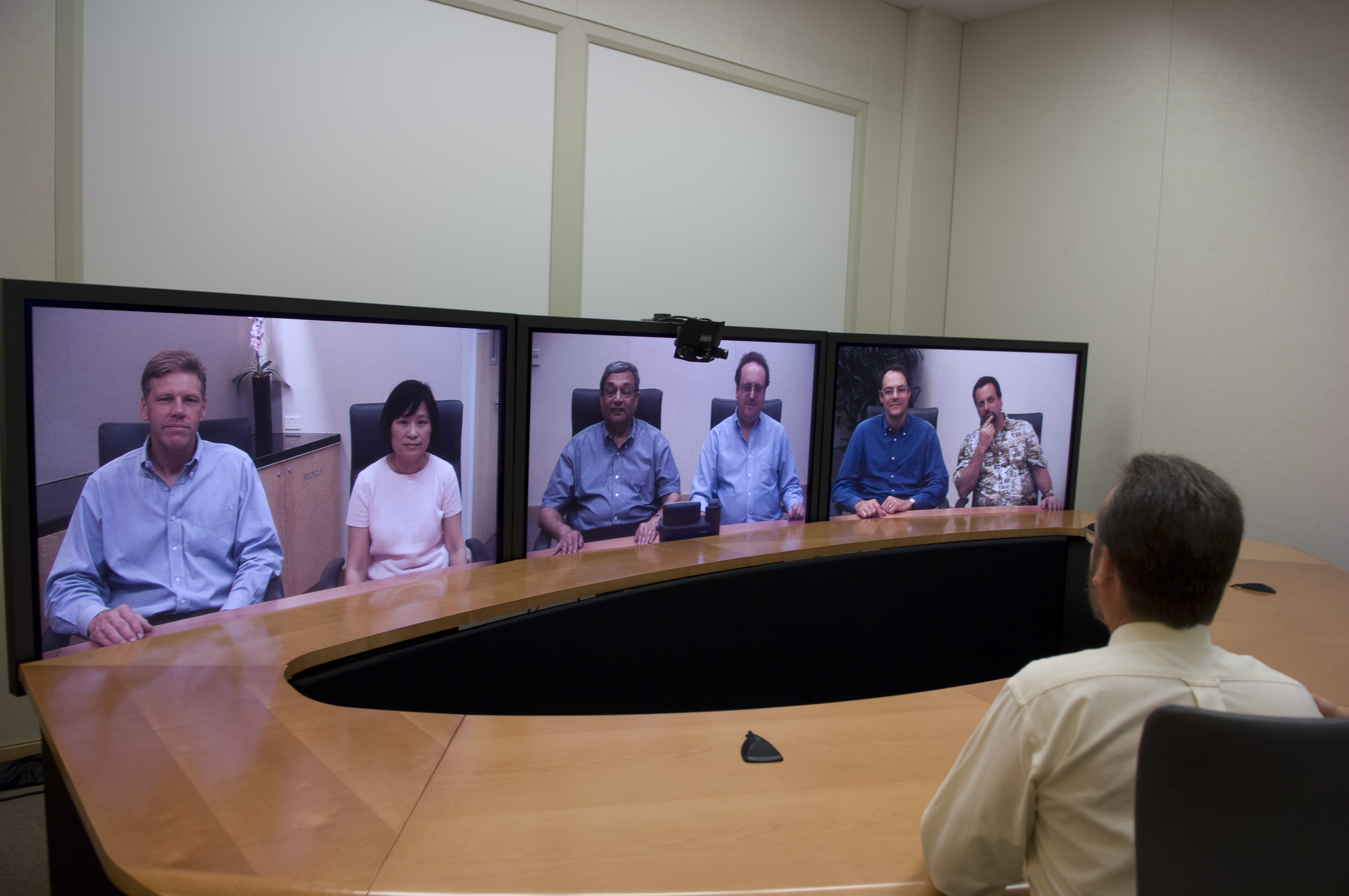
Cisco CTS-3000

== Products ==
These were the initial products:

- CTS-3000 - Room system for 6 persons
- CTS-1000 - Room system for 2 persons
- CTMS - Multipoint collaboration network appliance that connected multiple room systems into a single conference
- CTS-Man - Management application for integration with groupware, such as Microsoft Exchange which gives the system the ability to schedule meetings

They were designed so that the experience was as if local and remote participants were in the same room. These products offer features including up to three 1080p flat panel displays, special tables, microphones, speakers, cameras, collaboration interfaces and lighting.

In 2008 Cisco reported to have sold about 2,000 rooms, with about another 250 non-revenue (internal and philanthropic) units installed.

Later, other products were developed that expanded the use-cases for smaller offices and Webex connectivity.

In 2010 Cisco acquired the Norwegian company Tandberg and integrated their products into the Cisco portfolio.

Currently, a wide range of collaboration endpoints and conferencing infrastructure products is offered.

== Marketing ==
- The television series 24 and 30 Rock featured Cisco Telepresence product placements.
- Season 8. Episode 8 of NCIS also featured Cisco Telepresence product placements.
- The Video Game Tom Clancy’s Splinter Cell: Conviction (2010) featured Cisco Telepresence product placements.
