= Bergermoen =

Coordinates: 60°13′45″N 10°21′8″E

Bergermoen is an industrial area on the border between the municipals Ringerike in Buskerud and Jevnaker in Oppland. The Norwegian kitchen manufacturer Norema has its main office here.
