= Nobia =

Nobia AB
- Company type: Public limited company
- Founded: 1996; 29 years ago
- Headquarters: Stockholm
- Net income: 13 billion sek (2016)
- Number of employees: circa 4 000 (2024)
- Website: https://www.nobia.com/

Nobia AB (Nasdaq Stockholm: NOBI) is a Swedish company which owns many European kitchen-related firms. In 2008 it was the largest producer of kitchen furniture in Europe.

Nobia was formed in 1996 by IK Partners (Formerly Industri Kapital) through a buyout from STORA (now Stora Enso). The company's headquarters are in Stockholm, on whose stock exchange the sharebolag is listed. Nobia's major regional, national and international brands are present in many European countries. The company specializes in custom built-in kitchens and generates part of its revenue through franchising. In 2003, there was a legal dispute between Nobia and the German kitchen manufacturer Nobilia due to the likelihood of confusion between the two names.

Since 2019, Jon Sintorn has been the CEO and Group President.

== Group Companies ==
=== UK Region ===
- Magnet
- Magnet Projects
- Gower
- Commodore Design
- CIE

=== Nordic Region ===
- HTH
- Invita
- Marbodal
- Myresjökök
- Norema
- Novart
- Sigdal

=== Continental Europe Region ===
- Bribus
- EWE-FM
- Optifit
- Pronorm
