= Norema =

Norwegian kitchen manufacturer

- Industry: Kitchen manufacturer
- Headquarters: Bergermoen, Norway
- Key people: Ole Dalsbø, CEO
- Parent: Nobia

Norema AS is a Norwegian kitchen manufacturer, formed in 1970 as a merger of the companies Emaljeverket (from 1934) and Nordia (from 1946). Its main office is in Bergermoen near Jevnaker, Oppland.

It was bought by the Swedish corporation Nobia in 2000. As of 10 January 2008 Norema and Sigdal, also owned by Swedish Nobia, were without CEOs. Both companies were under the supervision of Nobia Norway.
