= Emaljeverket =

Norwegian enamelware and appliance manufacturer

- Company type: Aksjeselskap
- Industry: Enamelware, household appliances
- Founded: 1933
- Defunct: 1972
- Fate: Merged with Nordia to form Norema
- Headquarters: Hasle, Oslo, Norway
- Key people: Gregers Kure
- Products: Enamelware, washing machines, refrigerators, kitchen units

Emaljeverket (Norwegian for "The Enamel Works") was a factory in Oslo that produced enamelware, washing machines, refrigerators, and much else. It was started by Gregers Kure in 1933. Its products in the Evalet series were market leaders in the 1950s and 1960s, and the firm's modular kitchens were very popular. In 1970 Emaljeverket was merged with Nordia to form Norema.

== Establishment ==
Emaljeverket was started in 1933 by Gregers Kure (1906–1973), with production premises in a backyard at Schous Plass in Oslo. In 1936 the business moved into a new building at Hasle, only a stone's throw from the large factory that his father Per Kure ran under his own name in close cooperation with the Swedish ASEA.

Before the Second World War the firm produced especially enameling work on semi-finished goods, particularly for the stove industry. After the war the product range was expanded and directed especially at the flourishing housing-construction market, with everything for the bathroom and kitchen becoming Emaljeverket's hallmark. Bathtubs, sink units, and stainless dishwashing basins were some of the larger products, and Emaljeverket also went early into the design and production of kitchen units, first through the subsidiary A/S Moderne Kjøkken, in cooperation with its neighbor at Hasle, Trestandard. The somewhat too generic brand name "Moderne Kjøkken," which many copied, was replaced by the Nordia brand in 1957.

== Evalet ==
In 1950 the Evalet washing machine was launched, a product that had great success in Norway and Sweden, with 100,000 sold in Norway by the end of the decade, and production of refrigerators, among other things, was also started. Modular kitchens with integrated appliances and a dishwashing basin also became a product many came to associate with Evalet. A new factory at Rolvsrud in Lørenskog, completed in November 1961, was presented as one of the most modern, mechanized, and efficient industrial plants of its day, and was an extension of the focus on kitchen units under the Evalet brand. The new modular kitchen series was marketed from 1962 as Evalet, in competition particularly with Nordia, made to standardized dimensions and suited to efficient production in the new factory.

== Acquisitions and merger ==
In 1965 Emaljeverket bought both the Coop factory Termolux in Skien, which produced washing machines among other things, and the neighboring factory at Løren, Aanonsen Fabrikker. Aanonsen was big in refrigeration technology for shops, but also in household products such as bathroom scales, bread boxes, and a range of utensils that suited Emaljeverket's profile, and the group then had nearly 1,000 employees.

The merger took place by Emaljeverket taking over all the shares in Aanonsen, with a face value of 1 million kroner. Aanonsen's shareholders were paid in shares in the new Emaljeverket AS with a face value of 1.6 million kroner out of a total share capital of 8 million kroner. The aim of the merger was to cooperate in the expanding foreign market and to rationalize production through a division of labor and specialization between the sister companies, as there was considerable overlap in products, including refrigerators, home freezers, and other electrical household appliances.

== Emaljeverket is bought ==
In 1970 Emaljeverket sought cooperation with Standard Telefon og Kabelfabrik (STK), which, among its cable drums and telephone systems, had also found room to produce home freezers and refrigerators. There was thus a certain overlap between the two that could give Emaljeverket greater industrial muscle and strengthen this part of the group's activity, which was not especially large in a Norwegian context. STK is said to have promised to expand the factory in Skien and to make a larger push into the export market with refrigeration and freezing products at the front. A majority of Emaljeverket's board supported the plan, with only Gregers Kure opposed. Since STK was owned by the American ITT, a concession was required, which might have been straightforward had the Ministry of Industry not been presented with a Norwegian industrial alternative.

A consortium fronted by Nordia AS at Jevnaker, which Emaljeverket had helped start in 1946, had Storebrand, Porsgrunds Porselænsfabrik, and the appliance producer KPS in Sarpsborg on its side. They proposed a different path for Emaljeverket: a focus on becoming a fittings giant and shedding the entire electrotechnical production. Integrated kitchens with appliances from a single producer were fine, they held, but it would be better to invest in larger specialized units for each, namely kitchen and shop fittings at the new company merged from Nordia and Emaljeverket, under the name Norema, and electrotechnical production sold off to KPS, which would thereby also stand stronger in its specialty.

Choosing between a foreign alternative with vague promises and a concrete initiative from Norwegian industries and owners, the Ministry of Industry rejected STK's application to buy Emaljeverket. Norema became a reality as soon as Emaljeverket had replaced its board with one that voted for the merger. On 1 January 1970 Emaljeverket became a subsidiary of Norema. The well-known Evalet kitchen lasted until 1972, when the full integration of the enamel factory and Nordia into Norema was carried out and Norema was launched as the common brand name.

== Rationalized operation ==
An extensive rationalization in the merged company brought the gathering of woodware production at Nordia's plant at Jevnaker and a rebuilding of Emaljeverket at Lørenskog to take over all the remaining production from Hasle. The factory in Oslo was closed and the plant sold, and the workforce at Lørenskog grew to 330. After the merger of Nordia and the enamel factory into Norema, Jevnaker became the new main site for production, though the Rolvsrud plant kept pace until the group was hit hard by the economic crisis of the late 1980s. In 1988 all operations were gathered at Jevnaker and the Rolvsrud factory was closed. Norema's factory at Jevnaker was closed in 2009, while Norema's head office today is again at Lørenskog, from where the sale and marketing of products now made abroad are administered.

== The enamel factory in Enebakk ==
The Emaljeverket plant in Ekebergveien 48, Enebakk, was part of Emaljeverket in Oslo. Among other things, sink units were produced there. The Enebakk department was closed in 1975.

== Bibliography ==
- Emaljeverket A/S: 1934–1959. Emaljeverket. 1959.
