= Radionette =

Former Norwegian radio manufacturer

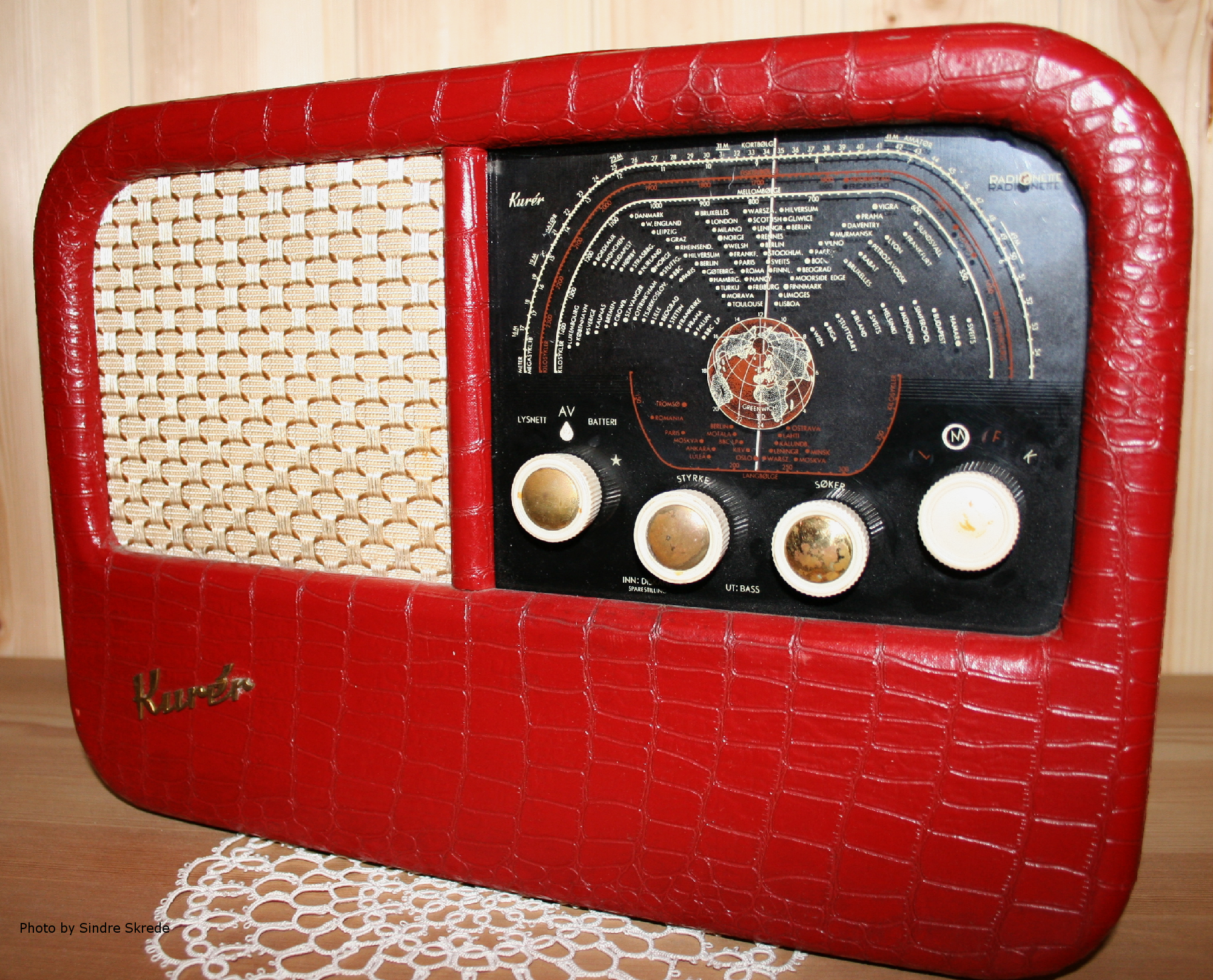
- The classic Radionette Kurér, produced in 224,000 copies from 1950 to 1958.
- Formerly: Jan Wessel, Radionette Norsk Radiofabrikk
- Company type: Aksjeselskap
- Industry: Electronics
- Founded: 1927
- Founder: Jan Wessel
- Defunct: 1978
- Fate: Merged with Tandberg; wound up
- Headquarters: Sandvika, Oslo, Norway
- Products: Radios, televisions, tape and record players

Radionette was a Norwegian radio factory founded in 1927 by Jan Wessel. It was the first in Europe to produce radios that could be connected directly to the electrical mains, and became especially known for its portable travel radios, later also producing televisions, tape recorders, and record players. Wessel started the business in his parents' apartment in Oslo, and in its founding year it introduced the first European model that could run directly off the mains, which became a sales success. Its best-known product, the portable Kurér radio, was made from 1950 and sold in large numbers, with 224,000 of the first model produced between 1950 and 1958 and exports to the Middle East and Africa.

In 1968 Radionette gathered its operations in a new plant at Sandvika with around 800 employees, but faced declining sales and growing foreign competition. In 1972 it was merged with Tandbergs Radiofabrikk, and in the summer of 1978 the Sandvika operation and all the Radionette companies were wound up, with Tandbergs Radiofabrikk going bankrupt later the same year. The Radionette trademark was afterward sold to Elkjøp and has since been used for televisions, radios, and stereo systems made in Asia.
