= Bernhard Tandberg =

Norwegian farmer and politician

Bernhard Tandberg (14 December 1856 – 21 June 1913) was a Norwegian farmer and politician.

He was born at Rustad in Lier as a son of farmers Hans Andreas Tandberg and Olava M. Skaugstad. He took secondary education in Drammen from 1867 to 1872, and later settled in Nes, Buskerud. He took over some forest owned by his father in 1881, and the family farm in 1887. He was also a timber merchant from 1886 and local savings bank director from 1888. He became a member of Nes municipal council in 1885, and served as mayor from 1892 to 1898. He was elected to the Parliament of Norway in 1900, representing the constituency of Buskeruds Amt. He did not win re-election until 1909. The constituency was now called Hallingdal, a single-member constituency.
