= Vebjørn Tandberg =

Norwegian electronics engineer

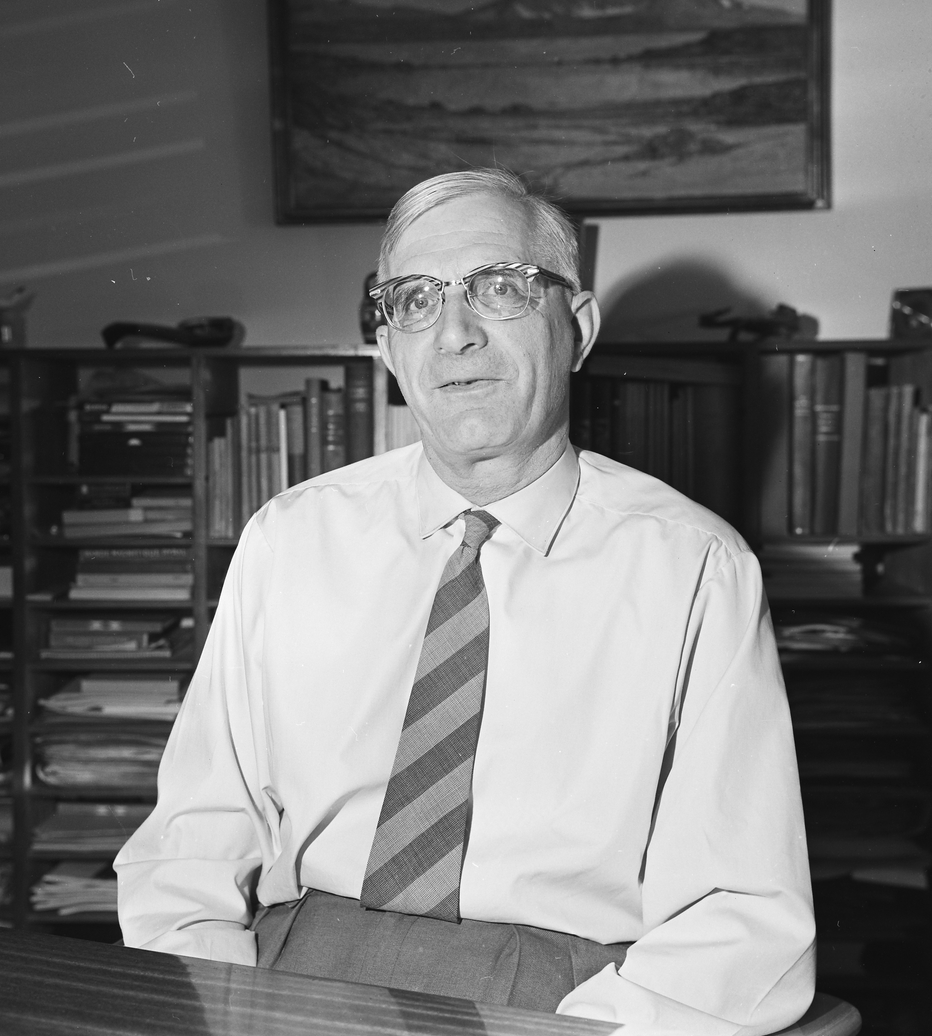
- Vebjørn Tandberg in 1963
- Born: 16 September 1904; Bodø, Norway
- Died: 30 August 1978 (aged 73); Oslo
- Education: Norwegian Institute of Technology
- Occupations: Electronics engineer and industrialist
- Known for: Founder of Tandbergs Radiofabrikk
- Relatives: Kari Vogt (niece)

Vebjørn Tandberg (16 September 1904 – 30 August 1978) was a Norwegian electronics engineer.

Tandberg was born at Bodø in Nordland, Norway. He attended the Norwegian Institute of Technology in Trondheim (1930).

He founded Tandbergs Radiofabrikk of Oslo in 1933 and made it a great success. In addition to his technical and commercial achievements, Tandberg was a pioneer in providing good conditions for his workforce. He instituted a 42-hour week and three weeks' annual vacation for all in 1937, and a free pension and health insurance scheme for all from 1938. A four-week vacation for all employees over 40 years of age was introduced in 1947, while the working week was reduced to 39 hours in 1948. There was a five-day work week during the summer months from 1955, over the full year from 1969.

His life ended under tragic circumstances—suicide—after financial problems at the radio factory and the ensuing political maneuverings had left him without control so that he was frozen out from his life's work. Subsequently, Tandbergs Radiofabrikk declared bankruptcy and underwent corporation reorganization .

== Other sources ==
- (in Norwegian) Dahl, Helmer; Strømme Svendsen, Arnljot (1995). Vebjørn Tandberg - triumf og tragedie. Fagbokforlaget. 263 pp. ISBN 82-7674-166-5.
- (in Norwegian) History of Tandbergs Radiofabrikk 1933–78
