= Tandberg =

Defunct electronics manufacturer

Coordinates: 59°54′28.83″N 10°37′8.37″E

- Company type: Division
- Industry: Telecommunication
- Founded: 1933; 93 years ago
- Founder: Vebjørn Tandberg
- Defunct: 19 April 2010
- Fate: Acquired by Cisco Systems
- Headquarters: Lysaker, Norway
- Key people: Jan Chr. Opsahl (CEO, Chairman)
- Products: Videoconference and telecommunications equipment
- Revenue: US$808.8 million (2008)
- Operating income: ▲US$176.7 million (2008)
- Net income: ▲US$140.8 million (2008)
- Number of employees: 1,450 (2008)
- Parent: Cisco Systems

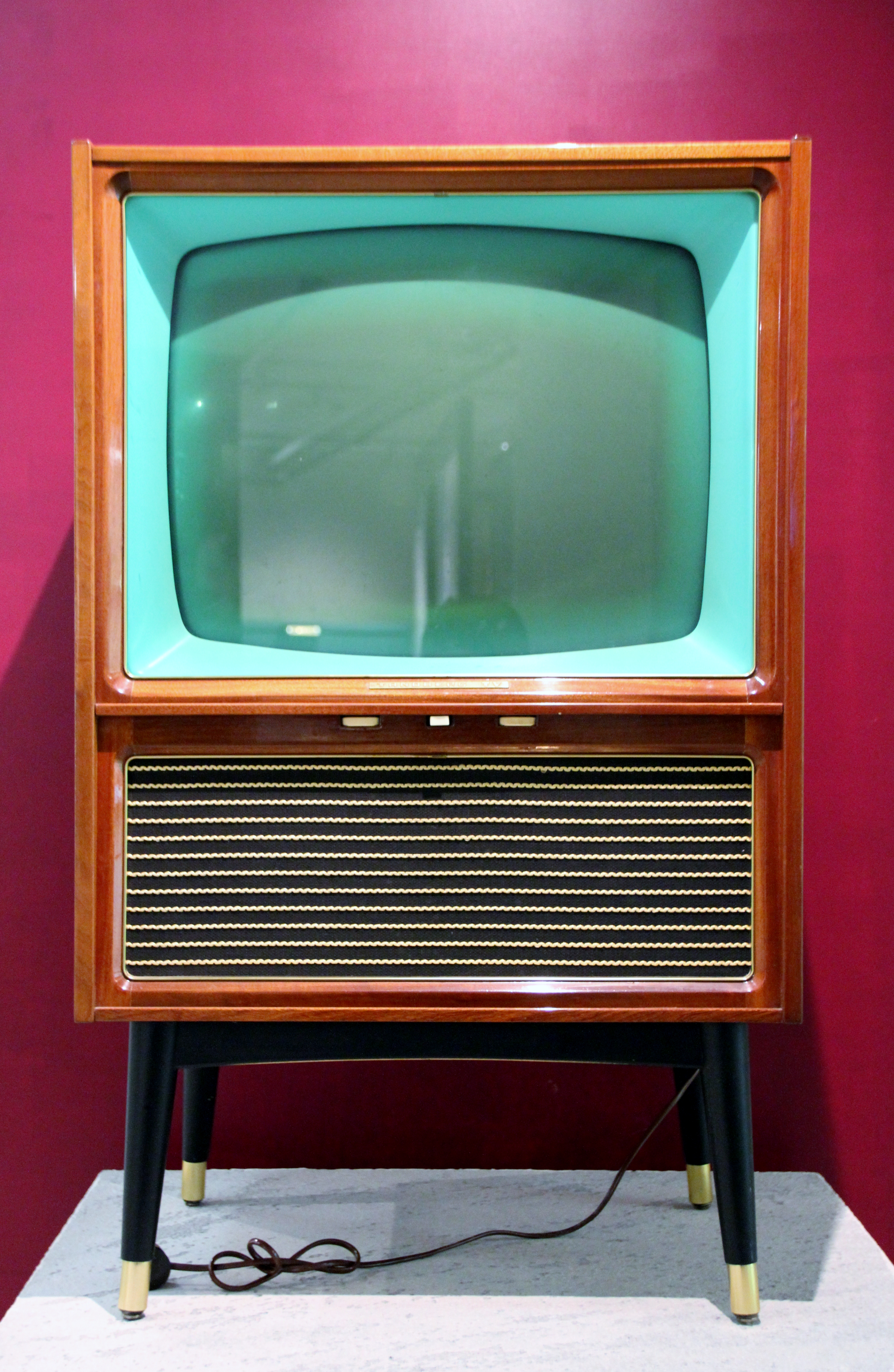
Tandberg TV 1962 (Oslo, Nordic Museum)

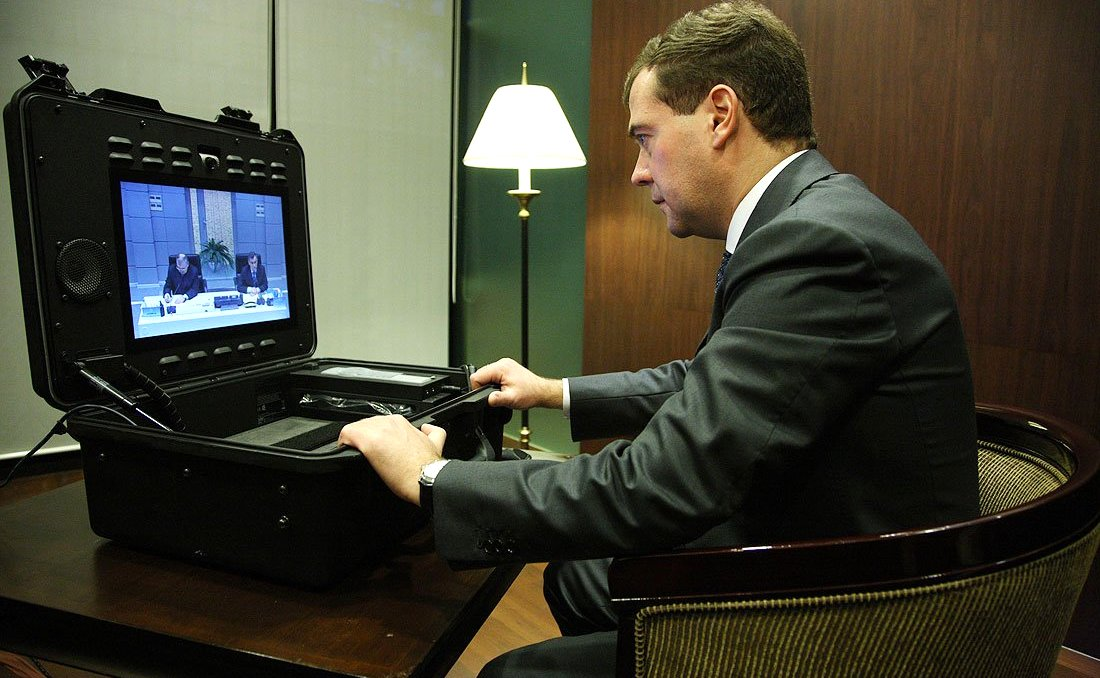
Dmitry Medvedev with Tandberg Tactical MXP. APEC Singapore 2009

Tandberg was an electronics manufacturer located in Oslo, Norway (production, sales and distribution) and New York City, United States (sales and distribution). The company began in the radio field, but became more widely known for their reel-to-reel tape recorders as well as cassette decks and televisions. The original company went bankrupt in 1978, after a sharp financial downturn. The following year, the company re-formed whilst its data division was split off as Tandberg Data, including the tape recording division, which reduced its scope to data recording.

Over time the original Tandberg company became increasingly involved in the teleconferencing systems, and became a leader in that field. The company's main competitor was Polycom and other competitors were HP, Sony, Radvision, VTEL and Aethra.

Cisco Systems acquired Tandberg on 19 April 2010. Tandberg Data became a German company dedicated to making computer tape storage systems.

== History ==
=== Tandbergs Radiofabrikk ===
The company was founded by Vebjørn Tandberg as Tandbergs Radiofabrikk (Tandberg's Radio Factory) in Oslo in 1933. The company's first radio was named "Tommeliten" (Tom Thumb), and used only earphones. This was followed by the "Corona" with a loudspeaker. In 1934, the first "Huldra" radio was launched, followed in 1936 by the "Sølvsuper". During the early years, radios, loudspeakers and microphones were the main output from the factory. The Sølvsuper and the Huldra radios became the foundation for Tandberg's success.

In the early 1950s, Tandberg opened a branch plant at Kjelsås (in Oslo) to produce reel-to-reel tape recorders. Their first model was introduced to the market in 1952. Over the next decade, Tandberg quickly incorporated a number of leading-edge concepts; the model 2 Hi-Fi of 1956 had three tape transport speeds, allowing improved high-frequency response. The model 3 Stereo from 1957 was Tandberg's first stereo system which allowed playback of stereo tapes, however the ability to record in stereo was not made available until the introduction of the model 5 in 1958, which allowed for the connection of an external recording amplifier to record the second channel onto the tape. Their first full stereo system, the model 6 of 1960, featured four amplifiers, two for recording and two for playback respectively, giving the operator total control of both audio channels. In the 1960s, Tandberg introduced the cross-field recording technique in the model 6X, allowing its recorders to handle higher frequencies than competing models. Tandberg licensed the concept to Akai, who utilized it extensively in the 1970s and 80s, in their Akai and Roberts recorders. In 1964, Tandberg inaugurated a new method of language teaching, the language laboratory, and with it its first fully transistorized tape recorder, the model 10, a recorder designed to serve as the teacher recorder in language classrooms. However the first transistorized recorder marketed to consumers was the model 12 of 1966, which among other things featured low impedance microphone inputs, designed for its first dynamic microphone, the TM 4. In 1969, Tandberg finally abandoned the use of vacuum tubes in its recorders, and the 6X which had introduced cross-field recording to the world, the last tube recorder still manufactured by Tandberg, went out of production. That same year a new lineup of transistorized Tandberg recorders entered the market to fill the gap left by the preceding models.

Tandberg tape recorders dominated the Norwegian market, and had a reputation for advanced technology and high quality at reasonable prices. It was on Tandberg reel-to-reel machines that President John F. Kennedy recorded many meetings in the Cabinet Room of the White House, including those associated with the Cuban Missile Crisis.

The Kjelsås factory also started producing TV sets in 1960, and in 1966, a second TV plant was opened in Kjeller in Skedsmo. Colour TV's were added to its lineup in 1969. In 1972, Tandberg purchased Radionette, another large Norwegian electronics firm now focusing on televisions. By 1976, TVs were Tandberg's major product and its factories employed 3,500. However, that same year a major economic downturn seriously disrupted the company, and by 1978, it was insolvent. A shareholder revolt removed Vebjørn Tandberg from control of the company, and he committed suicide in August. In December, the company declared bankruptcy.

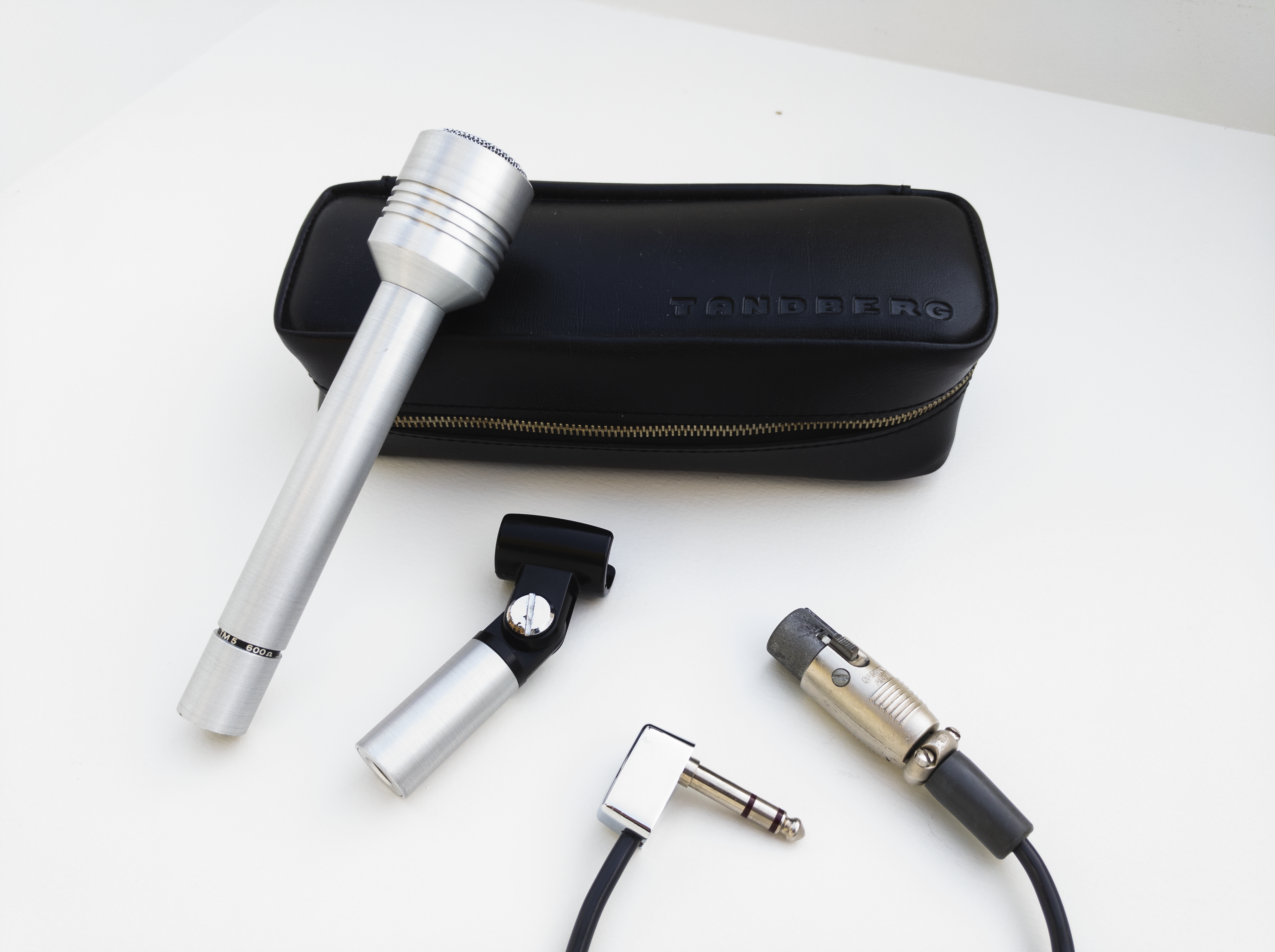
Tandberg Microphone 5 (TM 5)

=== Split-up ===
In the aftermath of the bankruptcy, the original Tandberg was split into two parts. Under the control of Siemens, Tandberg Data took over the computer terminal and tape recording parts of the company, moving the latter purely into the computer storage field. The remaining portions went under control of Norsk Data and lost the "Radiofabrikk" to become, simply, Tandberg.

Tandberg continued to develop audio technology including Actilinear and Dyneq.

In 1984, the consumer audio equipment division was spun off to become Tandberg Audio.

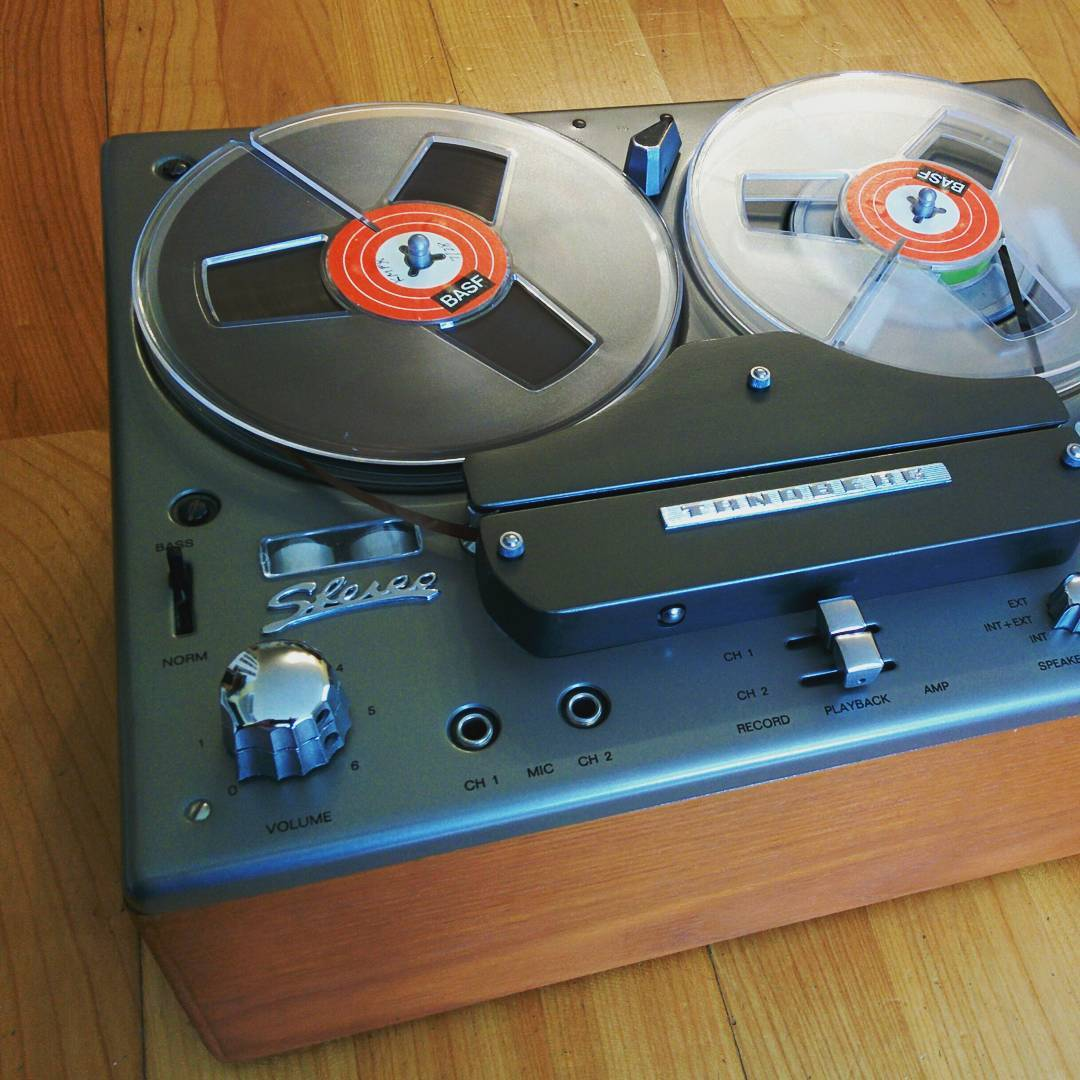
Tandberg Model 74 tape recorder

Tandberg's first picture telephone for ISDN was developed in 1989, while the fully integrated Vision H.320 picture telephone was launched in 1993. Subsequently, focus moved to higher performance systems – the Grand Vision and the Master Vision series. New desktop endpoints were also added – the Compact Vision and the Vision600.

The first US office opened in 1995 in Connecticut. It was moved to Kansas City for a short period before moving to Reston, Virginia in August 1996. In 1997, the company acquired two sales and distribution companies in North America, establishing a firm foothold in the single largest videoconferencing market in the world. It created two large sales and support offices in the US, one in Virginia and the other in Texas. The office in Reston, Virginia remains the largest office in the US to this day.

Also in 1997, the television manufacturing portions became Tandberg Television.

In 1999, the company acquired the Norwegian technology company Internet Technology AS which had developers experienced with the ITU H.323 standard, especially from VoIP-projects like the world's first commercial H.323 VoIP service launched in 1997 with Telenor.

In 2000, the company moved into IP-based videoconferencing using the maturing H.323 standard, making the entire product line IP-capable. Since 2000, the company has expanded its product line greatly, by adding enterprise-class MCUs, gateways, service-provider class MCUs and H.323 gatekeepers. In 2001, the company also acquired a consultancy company Delante AS which enabled it to focus more on external software integration and bindings, especially the Microsoft platform. In 2004, Ridgeway Systems and Software, a UK-based software house specializing in firewall and NAT traversal, was acquired. The result of this acquisition was the Tandberg Expressway Firewall Traversal technology, which allows any H.323 video endpoint to place calls through any number of firewalls or NAT devices.

In July 2004, the company released a major new endpoint product line, the "MXP" series.

In February 2005, the company released SIP software for all its video endpoints, as well as a major update to its SCCP based video systems.

In July 2005, the company acquired IVIGO from TNO Telecom. IVIGO, based in the Netherlands, developed and successfully commercialized circuit-switched video solutions for UMTS network operators, vendors and content providers. The IVIGO 3G-to-H.323 video gateway is now used by Tandberg's high-end visual communications systems to connect over video to 3G handheld phones.

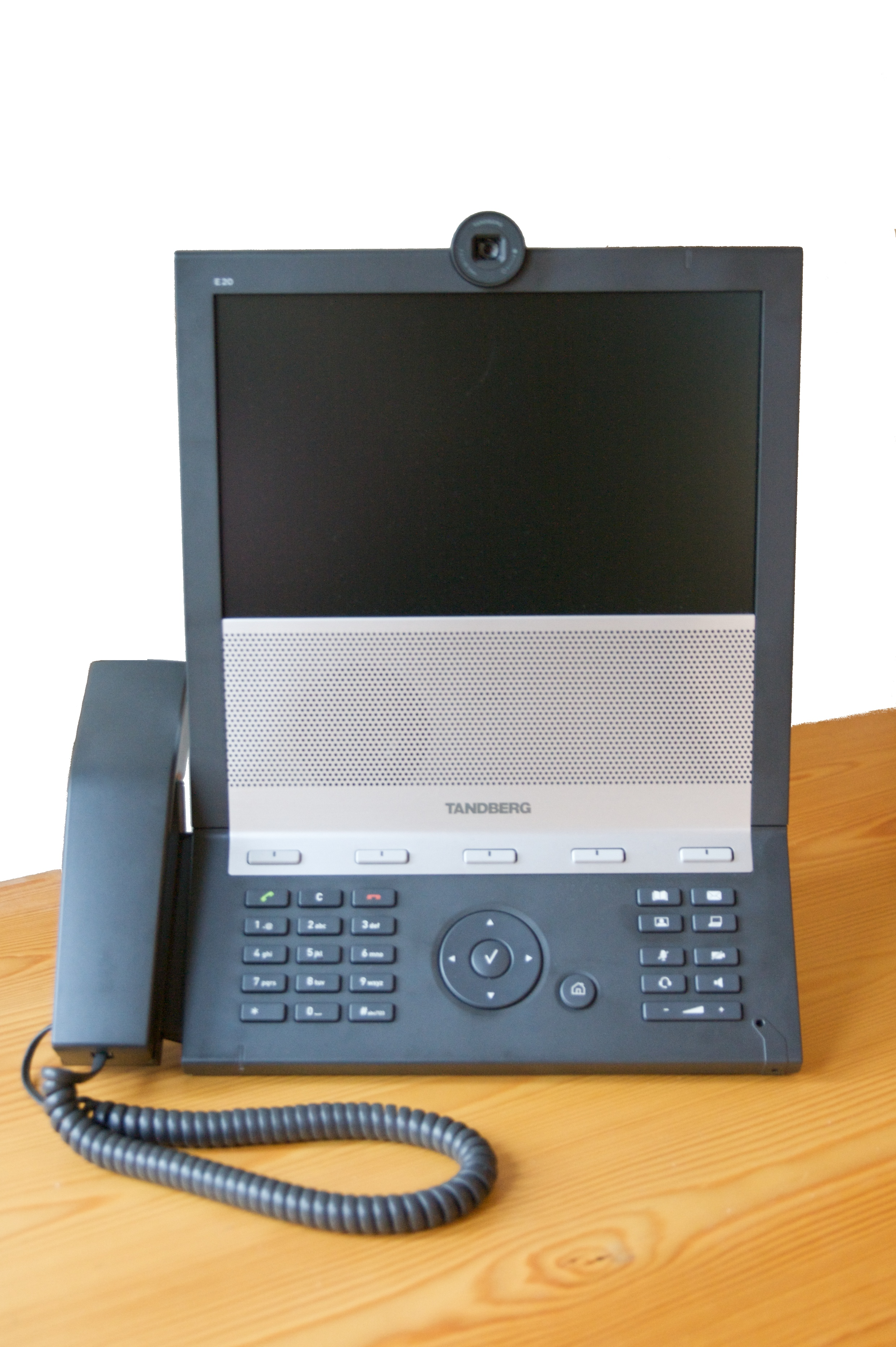
The Tandberg E20 personal videoconferencing system was introduced in 2008.

In September 2005, Cisco Systems officially launched the Cisco 7985G, a Cisco-Tandberg co-branded desktop videophone.

In October 2005, the company acquired Ectus, a New Zealand-based software development company specializing in streaming and archiving software.

On 16 December 2005, Andrew Miller stepped down as CEO, replaced by the CFO Fredrik Halvorsen. Halvorsen was a relatively new hire with a background from McKinsey.

In September 2007, the company acquired Codian, a rival developer of video-conferencing infrastructure products, for $270 million in cash and shares.

In 2009, the company introduced the full-HD "C-series" endpoint product line, including the "EX-series" desktop appliances, progressively replacing the previous "MXP" product series.

In October 2009, Cisco Systems made a $3 billion recommended offer to acquire Tandberg. After upping its offer to almost $3.4 billion, Cisco announced on 4 December 2009, that over 90% of Tandberg's shares had been tendered, allowing it to squeeze out the remaining shareholders. In February 2011, Tandberg was officially rebranded to Cisco, however the Tandberg name continues to be extensively used (as of mid 2011).

=== Codian ===
Codian is a former supplier of video conferencing products. The company became part of Tandberg in 2007. Codian was founded in 2002, and based in Langley, Slough, UK. Its main products included Multipoint Control Units and gateways. It was acquired by Tandberg in 2007 for US$270 million and its products continued to be sold under the "Tandberg Codian" brand name. Codian products are still supported and developed by Cisco under the same brand name, and Codian's original technology was used by Cisco to develop its own line of TelePresence servers.

== Companies sharing the name ==
There are also other companies called Tandberg with roots in the same parent company, although not necessarily with common ownership:

- SANAKO/Tandberg Educational
- Tandberg Audio
- Tandberg Unterrichtstechnik (Deutschland)
- Tandberg Data
- Tandberg Storage
- Tandberg Telecom – fully owned subsidiary
- Tandberg Television

== Products ==
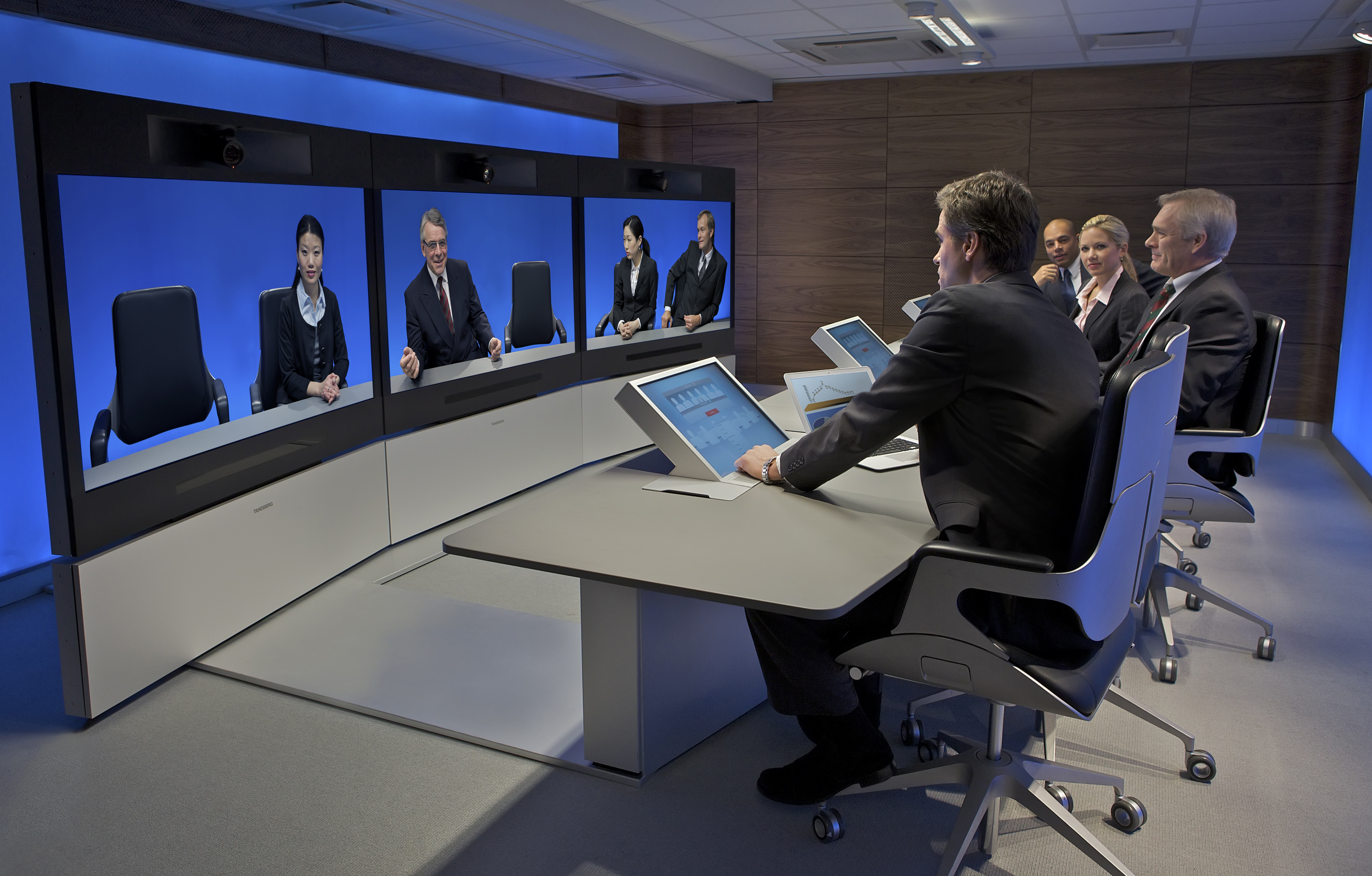
A Tandberg T3 high resolution telepresence room in use (2008).

- Immersive Conferencing systems: Tandberg T1 & T3,
- Personal systems such as desktop systems, video enabled VOIP phones and video-conferencing solutions for mobile phones and tablets
- Call Control systems like the Video Communication server or the enterprise level Unified Communications Manager
- Videoconference Manager: Cisco Telepresence Manager and the software suite to manage the CTM. The CTM makes it possible to connect any device in a single "Telepresence" conference call
- CTM Director for enterprise wide management of all CTM endpoints
- Infrastructure systems:

- Telepresence server
- MSE 8000 series multipoint video conferencing systems
- MCU conferencing bridges: MCU 4200 and 4500 series
- Media Processing System: MPS200 and MPS800
- Cisco Telepresence multipoint switches: combine any type of TP endpoints in one call
- Infrastructure: Advanced Media Gateway, IP Gateway server, IP/ISDN Gateway servers and content servers
- Conference recorders: Tandberg IP VCR and Cisco Telepresence Recording server to allow recording of multipoint video conferences
- Video conferencing cloud services: enable video conferences between different companies crossing one's own (network) borders, but maintaining high level of security.

With the supporting system included in the Immersive systems or dedicated management servers, all these systems can interact with each other and be used in one conference session: people using a video-enabled smartphone or tablet can participate in a conference-call setup using the CTS models, and everyone automatically receives both optimal image quality and features for their system. The proprietary protocol used in the Immersive TP systems can interact with industry open standards used in mobile phones, tablets and video-enabled VOIP devices regardless of their vendor: any device can connect to any other system The product portfolio of existing Cisco video conferencing solutions and the Tandberg systems are now combined in one portfolio. The Tandberg product names have changed, but they are still being offered using the Tandberg brand name, and overlaps still remain in the portfolio.

== Controversy ==
In November 2010, Fiona Glaser, an x264 developer, published information in which she claims that one of Tandberg Telecom's patent applications from December 2008, contains a step-by-step description of an algorithm she committed to the x264 codebase around two months earlier. This was relayed by media, which remarked that the employee who filed the patent was following the x264 project IRC development channel and was known to the project developers, leading to Tandberg claiming that it discovered the algorithm independently. Copies of e-mails that demonstrate this, together with an affidavit and an Information disclosure statement was filed by Tandberg with the United States Patent and Trademark Office in June 2011.
