= Nakamichi (disambiguation) =

Nakamichi is a Japanese consumer electronics brand.

Nakamichi may also refer to:

- Nakamichi, Yamanashi, a former town in Higashiyatsushiro District, Yamanashi Prefecture, Japan

== People with the surname ==
- Etsuro Nakamichi (died 1982), Japanese businessman
- Hitomi Nakamichi (中道 瞳, born 1985), Japanese volleyball player
- Toshikazu Nakamichi (中道 紀和, born 1971), Japanese rugby union player
