= Ding Wei =

Ding Wei may refer to:

- Ding Wei (Go player) (born 1979), Chinese professional Go player
- Ding Wei (Song dynasty) (c. 966–1037), Song dynasty chancellor
- James Ting (born 1951), or Ding Wei, Chinese-Canadian businessman
- Wei Ding, Chinese and American computer scientist
