= Threshold Audio =

Audio equipment manufacturing company

Threshold Audio is a high-end audio equipment manufacturer originally established in California in 1974 by audio engineer Nelson Pass and graphic designer René Besne. The company, today based in Houston Texas, manufactures mono-block and stereo power amplifiers, multi-channel power amplifiers and stereo control amplifiers.

== Nelson Pass and the founding of Threshold ==
In the early 1970s, Nelson Pass was studying Physics at the University of California-Davis. While a student, he founded PMA to design and manufacture speakers. In 1972, he joined ESS speakers in Sacramento just prior to the arrival of Oscar Heil, who would design the Heil Air Motion Transformer which was a key component of the ESS AMT series of speakers. Pass worked at ESS designing crossovers and enclosures through 1973. He also was a service manager for Sun Stereo performing repairs on McIntosh Laboratory, Phase Linear, Pioneer Corporation and other brands of amplifiers, and began formulating his own amplifier designs in 1974. Pass received his Bachelor of Science in Physics and with an ESS associate René Besne they together began development of a new amplifier in 1974. Besne worked on the industrial design of the amplifier while Pass worked on the circuit topology and component selection. When they were confident the amplifier was ready to market, Pass and Besne incorporated Threshold as co-founders in Sacramento, California on December 5, 1974.

== Early Threshold Amplifier Designs ==
The first amplifier sold by Threshold was the model 800A, introduced in early 1975. This was a Class A 200 watt per channel five-stage amplifier with triple series/triple parallel/triple Darlington output stage with a dynamic bias circuit. During development of the 800A, Pass and Besne met Joe Sammut, who later became a business partner in Threshold. The second amplifier offered some months later was the 400A which featured 100 watts per channel. Threshold also released the NS 10 pre-amplifier in 1977.

The Threshold amplifiers drew the attention of audiophiles and editors at audio equipment magazines. In the late 1970s, Pass further developed his amplifier technology and Threshold began to market the STASIS line of amplifiers. This served as the basis of Threshold’s amplifier line throughout the 1980s. Pass was quoted as saying, “The Stasis 1 was the statement product for what became the popular Stasis product line, which served Threshold for the life of the company.” In another interview, he stated: “The Stasis amplifier certainly stands out as probably the premier example of a simple, creative topology that’s done a very good job and stood the test of time.” Virtually all Threshold amplifiers and pre-amplifiers displayed a luxurious look of "sculptured" brushed aluminum faceplates that were Besne's hallmarks of the entire line in keeping with the components’ substantial price. Some of the equipment was offered in black or clear (silver) anodized finish as well. In 1985 the Japanese audio company Nakamichi contacted Threshold to lease a patent license for the Stasis technology and consult with Nelson Pass, in order to design and market a few high-end stasis amplifiers. The resulting Nakamichi PA-5, PA-7 and PA-7 series II amplifiers was sold successfully for several years as well as a few Nakamichi receivers also utilizing amplifier sections utilizing Stasis technology.

== The 1990s to the Present ==
Pass was still chairman of Threshold when the November 1991 issue of Stereophile published their extensive interview with him. In subsequent interviews he stated he left Threshold at the end of 1991 to establish Pass Labs and have more autonomy in his amplifier design. Besne also left the firm. During the early 1990s, new amplifier designs known as the T Series were produced by design engineers Mikael Bladilaius, Mike Jaynes and Wayne Coburn. The company also introduced a small line of more affordable amplifiers marketed under the name Forte. With the advent of Home Theater in the late 1990s, high-end audio companies in general and Threshold in particular struggled to retain its audiophile base of customers. Despite its reputation for building an excellent range of audio equipment, Threshold ceased operations sometime during this period. However, by 2000 new buyers had been found for the rights to the designs, tooling, inventory and the Threshold name. An upgraded range of amplifiers based on the proven Stasis technology were brought to market and successfully reestablished the company, known today as Threshold Audio.

== Current Product Line ==
Today, Threshold Audio is located on Emmott Road in Houston, Texas. The current line of Control Preamplifiers includes the T/Pod with iPod input, the Stasis-R 3.0 Stereo Control Preamplifier, and the Stasis-R 5.0 Stereo Control Preamplifier. Current Power amplifiers include the Stasis 7.0 100w/ch Stereo Amplifier, the Stasis 8.0 200w/ch Stereo Amplifier, the S/3700e Multi-channel Power Amplifier, and the S/7000e MonoBlock Power Amplifier.
