= Akai AX80 =

Analogue synthesizer

AX80
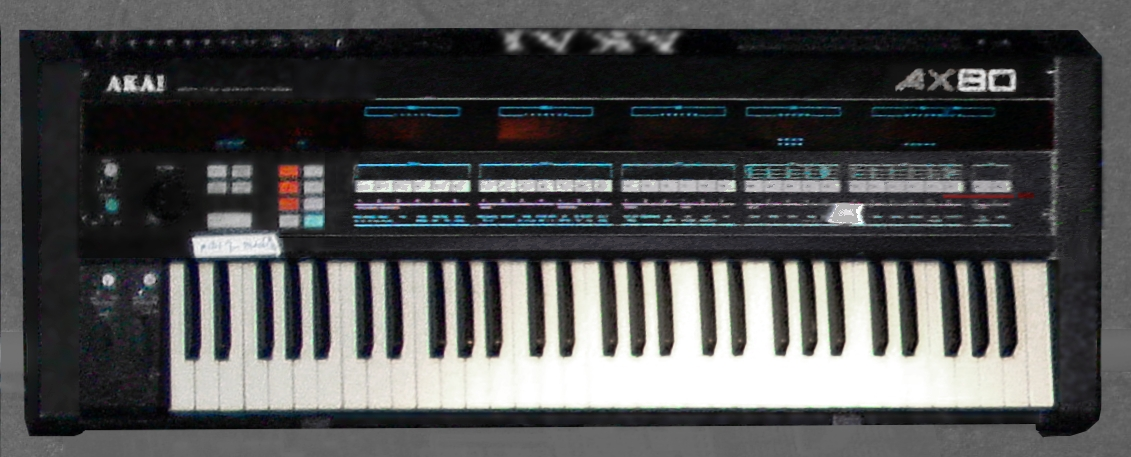
- Akai AX80
- Manufacturer: Akai
- Dates: 1984

Technical specifications
- Polyphony: 8 voices
- Timbrality: 1 sound
- Oscillator: 2 DCOs plus sub-oscillator per voice
- LFO: 4 (2 oscillator pitch, one filter, one pulse-width)
- Synthesis type: Analogue subtractive
- Filter: 24 dB/octave resonant lowpass; highpass

Input/output
- Keyboard: 61 keys, velocity sensing
- Left-hand control: pitch & modulation wheels
- External control: MIDI, sustain pedal, program footswitch

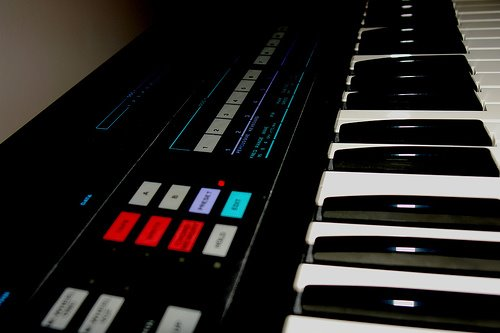
Akai AX80 synthesizer

The AX80 is a polyphonic analogue keyboard synthesizer manufactured by Akai in 1984. It was Akai's first venture into the professional electronic musical instrument market. The AX80 used digitally controlled oscillators (DCO) and filter circuitry based on the Curtis Electromusic CEM 3372 integrated circuit. It was marketed as part of a line of project studio equipment called the Akai Music Studio System, which included the S612 digital sampler the MR16 drum machine, the MS08 sequencer, and the MG1212 multitrack tape recorder.

== Features and cabinet ==
This electronic keyboard is an 8-voice polyphonic, digitally controlled analogue synthesizer. It has 64 memory locations for sounds ("patches"), arranged in two banks of 32 each, plus a bank of 32 factory preset sounds. The instrument has basic MIDI implementation, but lacks the ability to save or restore sounds except by using cassette tape.

=== Front panel ===
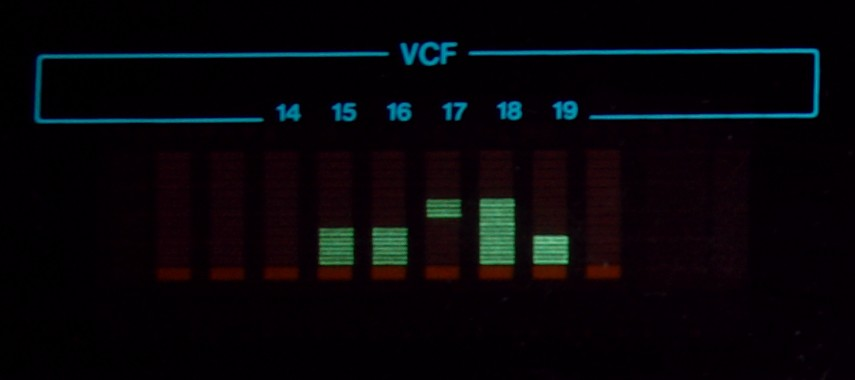
Figure 1. Fluorescent display of filter parameters

The front panel has a volume knob, a master tuning knob, a data entry knob for programming patches, modulation and pitch wheels with knobs for the depth of the effect, and various buttons to switch on and off modulation destinations, enable chord memory, transpose the keyboard, or infinitely sustain notes. The case is black metal with fluorescent displays to indicate the status of different synthesis parameters (see Figure 1), and black rubberized end pieces. A possibly earlier version may have had gloss painted wooden ends.

=== Back panel ===
The back panel is unusual in that it is tilted from vertical so that the connectors can be seen from the front of the instrument. There are quarter-inch jacks for recording data to cassette tape, sustain and program change footpedal jacks, MIDI in, out and "thru" DIN connectors, a monaural quarter-inch audio output, a quarter-inch headphone jack, and memory protect and power switches. Some models have a voltage selection for the power supply on the underneath of the synth.

=== Keyboard ===
The keyboard is five octaves (61 notes, C to C) and is unweighted. It has velocity, but not aftertouch, sensitivity. The output MIDI velocity values span the full range (up to 127), but only discrete "steps" are used (in other words, not every integer value from 1 to 127). It uses rubber keypad type membrane switches, rather than J-wires. A common issue can be these switches not working, which can be due to contamination or corrosion of contacts under the pads.

== Voice architecture and sound programming ==
=== Voice architecture ===
The synthesizer voices are somewhat similar to those found in the Roland JX-3P or Teisco SX-240, in that there are two oscillators (referred to as "OSC"s) per voice, with the option of sawtooth and/or square waveforms. These oscillators are controlled digitally with analog circuitry used only to create the sawtooth waveshape. OSC2 can be synchronized to OSC1, or the two oscillators can be cross-modulated. The OSCs can be separated by semitone intervals (up to four octaves) and detuned (to approximately a semitone). There is pulse-width modulation of the square wave of OSC1 (with a dedicated low-frequency oscillator (LFO) for this) and a square-wave sub-oscillator that is fixed at one octave lower. OSC2's pitch can be modulated by one of the two ADSR envelope generators, which are dedicated to VCA volume and VCF cutoff frequency. The filter is a 24dB/octave (four-pole) resonant lowpass type, and there is also a separate 12 dB/octave highpass filter that is not envelope controlled.

Tracking of filter cutoff frequency with keyboard position is fully variable, allowing for sounds to become either "brighter" or "darker" as higher notes are played. Keyboard velocity can affect volume and/or filter cutoff.

The modulation section of this synthesizer features four low-frequency oscillators. Three of these each have four available waveforms (sine, square, sawtooth and ramp), and these LFOs are dedicated to filter cutoff, and pitch of each of the two oscillators. These also have a programmable delay before their effect sets in. The fourth LFO is dedicated to pulse-width modulation of OSC1, and only its rate and depth are programmable.

There is also a programmable output level for each patch, to help balance loud and soft sounds. Notably missing from the voice architecture are white noise and portamento.

=== Performance controls ===
The AX80 has knobs for master volume and tuning, and a data entry knob that can be used to alter the currently selected parameter in real-time, although the value will jump to the knob's current position. There are various switches to select modulation destinations controlled by the modulation wheel (filter and pitch), to enable chord memory or infinite sustain of notes, and to select or edit sounds. The pitch-bend and modulation wheels also have knobs governing the depth of the effect of each. Footswitches can control sustain, or switch sounds by moving up one patch at a time.

=== MIDI implementation ===
The AX80 has fairly standard MIDI implementation for an instrument of this vintage, with the ability to use any channel (1-16) for transmission or reception (these can be set separately). The instrument does not recognize the MIDI tuning request, nor does it allow for saving or loading sounds (patches) to a computer via system-exclusive data dumps.

== Designer ==
The AX80 was designed by Kazuo Morioka. He previously ran his own synthesizer company, Hillwood, also known as Firstman, from 1972 up until the early 1980s, with his synthesizers released by Multivox in North America, before joining Akai in the early 1980s. He also designed other Akai Music Studio System instruments in the early 1980s, such as the MG1212 multitrack tape recorder.

== Accessories ==
When it was released, Akai advertised various accessories for the AX80: a footswitch (PS-X80), the FC-X80 flight case, HC-X80 hard case, SC-X80 soft case, and a vinyl dust cover (DC-X80).

== Use in recorded music ==
An AX80 appears in the video for Kim Mitchell's song "All We Are", played by Pye Dubois, although the manufacturer's name is blacked out. Greek synth-pop duo Marsheaux and U.K alternative act Spacehotel are also said to use the AX80, as is '90s dance act Rodeo Jones and Mark Bell of LFO on Björk's Homogenic album. The Dutch band Digital Emotion explicitly names the use of the AX80 and S612 on the label of their 1986 single “Jungle Beat”.

== Literature ==
Full-page advertisements with the slogan "Simply...Awesome!" ran in Keyboard Magazine during the mid-1980s. The AX80 also appears in the price lists at the end of both editions of Mark Vail's Vintage Synthesizers. The second edition contains a footnote: "If you can get around the interfaces on the Akai AX-series synths, Wes Taggart (of Analogics [Geneva, Ohio, USA]) reports that 'a good-sounding synth lies beneath'". Jim Aikin reviewed the AX80 in Keyboard Magazine in January 1985, noting it has a "warm, full sound, and can deliver a full palette of musically useful tone colors.... an excellent first entry into the keyboard market, by a company that we're sure to be seeing more from." Keyboard also printed a capsule summary in its new product profile "Spec Sheet" feature. There is also a two-page review in Complete Guide to Synthesizers, Sequencers, and Drum Machines, by Dean Friedman.

== Bibliography ==
- "Section 3. Schematic Diagram and PC Boards". Programmable Polyphonic Synthesizer Model AX80 [service manuals]. Tokyo, Japan: Akai Electric Co., Ltd. 1985. Printed No. 850422-G1-1000.
- Vail, Mark (2000). Vintage Synthesizers (second ed.). San Francisco: Miller Freeman Books, 1993. ISBN 978-0-87930-603-8.
- AX80 marketing brochure, Akai Electric Co., Ltd., Tokyo, Japan, circa 1984
- Akai Professional brochure, Akai Electric Co., Ltd., Tokyo, Japan, circa 1985
- Akai Micro Studio System fold-out brochure, Akai Electric Co., Ltd., Tokyo, Japan, circa 1984
- AX80 user's manual
