= 1/4 inch Akai =

Early videotape format

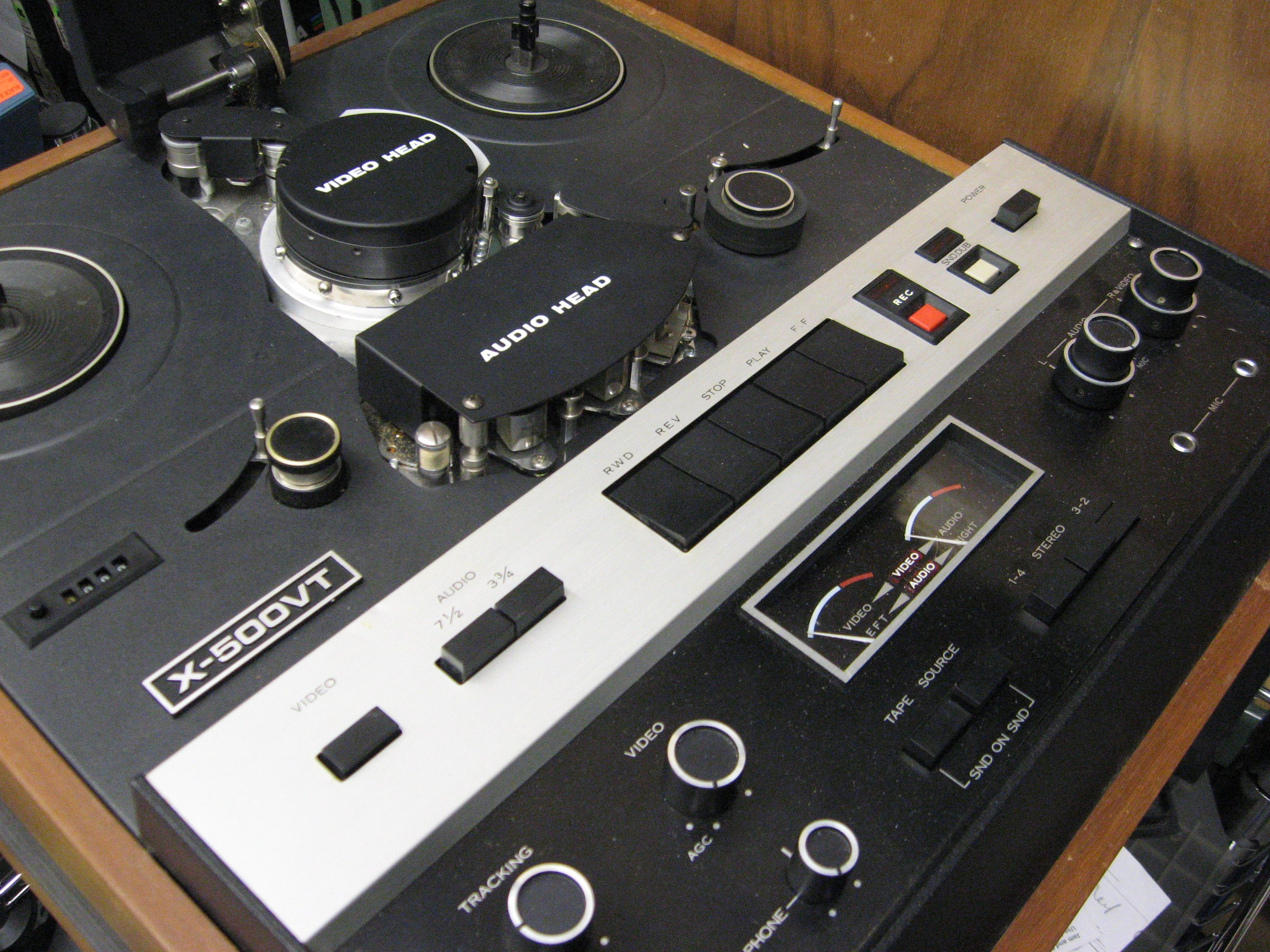
- Akai X-500VT 1/4 inch (6.4 mm) VTR at DC Video
- Media type: Magnetic tape
- Encoding: NTSC, PAL, SECAM
- Read mechanism: Helical scan
- Write mechanism: Helical scan
- Standard: Interlaced video
- Developed by: Akai
- Usage: Home movies
- Released: 1967

The 1/4 inch Akai is a portable helical scan EIA and CCIR analog recording video tape recorder (VTR) with two video record heads on the scanning drum. The units were available with an optional RF modulator to play back through a TV set, as well as a detachable video monitor. The Akai Electric Ltd. VTR plant was in Tokyo, Japan.

== Black-and-white models ==
Akai model VTS-100 was introduced in 1967 and was a B&W portable VTR with a one tube camera.

The next models, VTS-110 and VTS-120, had similar specifications:

- S/N > 40 dB
- Playback: about 200-lines of image resolution
- Capstan Tape speed (EIA) 11.25 inches (286 mm) per second (20 minute reel) / (CCIR) 23.85 cm/s (24 minute reel)
- VTR Weight: 11 lb.
- Monitor Weight: 3.5 lb.

The Akai X500-VT is perhaps the oddest of the Akai format machines in as much as it is both a stereo reel to reel audio recorder of 3 3/4 in/s (9.5 cm/s) and 7.5 in/s (19 cm/s) tape speed having an auto reverse function, as well as a video recorder combined in the same machine. Two separate tape paths are used and according to the way the tape is threaded, either two channel stereo audio 4-track, or black and white video with monoaural sound could be recorded and played. Tape speed for video recording like the VT100 and VT110 is 11 1/4 in/s (29 cm/s).

For the time, this machine was very advanced using many innovations not used in other domestic video machines for many years, such as inverter drive video head motor. About 10 years later, when Sony introduced the Beta format, in the first couple of models the video head speed was controlled by a line synchronized AC motor and eddy-current brake.

The X500VT was sold only in Japan and the United States (under the Rheem/Roberts re-badge agreement) and in very low quantities due to its high cost. the highest serial number known to author is 00050, indicating the probability of only a tiny production run.

Camera specs:

- One 2/3" Vidicon video camera

Akai produced two types of portable black and white VTR using 1/4 inch (6.4 mm) tape: Portables using an open reel of 13 cm diameter (VT-100/-110/-120), and a single stationary model using a 27 cm open reel, designated VT-700.

== Color model ==
Akai model VTS-150 was introduced in 1974. It recorded composite video on 1/4 inch (6.4 mm) reel-to-reel videotape and could record and play back B&W or color. It came with a hand-held two-tube camera with a zoom lens. The system was very small and lightweight for its time. The VTR with the video camera weighed only 22 pounds. A single cable was used to connect the ENG camera to the VTR for power, video and the microphone audio. This model was available in NTSC, PAL and SECAM television formats.

VTR specs:

- S/N > 40 dB
- Playback: about 230-lines of image resolution
- Capstan Tape speed (EIA NTSC): 254.27 mm/s (10.011 in/s); (CCIR PAL or SECAM): 217.97 mm/s
- Recording time: 26 minutes (NTSC) or 30 minutes (PAL or SECAM) on a 5-inch (130 mm) reel
- One audio track
- One control track
- Weight: 16.4 lb.
- Power consumption: 32 Watts
- Battery capacity: about 40 minutes
- Size 10.5 in × 14.2 in × 5.6 in (270 mm × 360 mm × 140 mm)

Camera specs (NTSC, PAL and SECAM):

- S/N > 40 dB
- One 2/3" Vidicon
- One chroma Tube, an Akai dissector tube
- 1.5 in (38 mm) VF - viewfinder
- Lens: 6x - (1.5 to 75 mm)
- 300 lines of resolution
- To use without the VTR, CCU-150 powered the camera with 12 VDC
- CCU-150 had RF output and Genlock sync input
- Weight: 5.76 lb.
- Size 3.5 in × 9.3 in × 13.2 in (89 mm × 236 mm × 335 mm)
- Microphone audio impedance: 600 ohms

== See also ==
- Akai VK
