= Nelson Pass =

Prolofic Audio Amplifier Designer & Enthusiast

Nelson Pass (born June 27, 1951) is an American designer of audio amplifiers. Pass holds at least seven U.S. patents related to audio circuits.

== Career ==
=== Studies, PMA and ESS ===
In 1974, he received his BS in physics from the University of California-Davis. During his studies, he and Mike Maher founded the small speaker company PMA. From 1973 to 1974, he was employed at ESS and assisted Dr. Oskar Heil with crossover design, woofer selection, and final build cabinetry of audiophile, consumer grade loudspeakers. Nelson Pass holds 6 patents related to magneplanar speakers.

=== Threshold ===
After graduating in 1974, he and René Besne founded high-end amplifier company Threshold Electronics on December 5, 1974. Later, Joe Sammut became the third partner. Threshold is perhaps best known for the "Stasis" amplifiers (a design later also produced under license by Nakamichi). During his time there he demonstrated an Ion Cloud loudspeaker at CES in 1980, based on ion wind technology. He sold Threshold Electronics in 1997. The company continued without Nelson Pass under the name Threshold Audio.

=== Adcom ===
In the mid 1980s, Pass designed the well-reviewed Adcom GFA-555 amplifier. This was a Bipolar Junction Transistor (BJT) based design. Nelson also designed the GFA-5XXX MOSFET-based series of high-bias class-AB amplifiers for Adcom (i.e. -5300, -5400, -5500, -5800) and the GFP-750 preamp.

=== Pass Labs ===
Pass founded Pass Labs in 1991. Pass (and his companies) designed and produced the Class A "Aleph" series of single-ended amplifiers. Pass Labs produces the X series amplifiers, which make use of the "supersymmetry" topology patented by Pass, to give extremely low distortion levels, and more recently the XA series of amplifiers, which advantageously combines aspects of the Aleph design with the "supersymmetry" technique. Recently, Pass Labs has introduced a loudspeaker, and Pass DIY has increasingly explored the field of high-efficiency and full-range speakers as a complement to minimalist amplifier designs.

=== First Watt ===
In parallel with Pass Labs, Pass also runs First Watt, a self-described "kitchen table" commercial venture where Pass hand-builds (in very limited numbers) some low-power / minimalist designs he chooses to not series produce through Pass Labs. His SIT amplifiers are the first of a new generation of audio amplifiers using Static Induction Transistors in a single-stage, single-ended, Class A circuit without feedback or degeneration. The SIT chip combines a square-law input character with a low impedance output to form the only solid-state gain device, which Pass claims, "behaves like a triode tube." There is no output transformer on the SIT amps. The point of the SIT is that it behaves like a triode but at lower voltages and higher currents, so it doesn't need a matching transformer to deliver power to 8 Ohms. Like tubes, SITs have soft overload clipping. When brief bursts of musical energy occur, SITs react with rounded waveform tops instead of sharp and hard clipping of solid-state. SITs have a curve which looks a lot like a triode vacuum tube; low at first and climbs steadily. The distortion curve is similar, a steady rise instead of a valley with high distortion at both ends.

== DIY ==
Pass has been supportive of the DIY audio community by way of published articles (notably in The Audio Amateur) as well as providing schematics for out-of-production models on the Pass Labs site, and more recently for the First Watt site. He often interacts directly (and somewhat tersely) with audio hobbyists. His nickname among the DIY audio community is "Papa".
