= Akai AR900 =

The Akai Professional AR900 is a stereo 16-bit MIDI digital reverb, that could also be controlled by the optional AR900T remote control. It belongs to the "Akai White Series", a family of musical products launched in the last part of the 1980s. It was produced between 1986 and 1989.

According to Akai Professional's official 1988-89 Musical Instruments catalog: "The AR900 is a high quality 16-bit digital reverb with 20 preset reverb programs. Numerous variations may be created by adjusting the pre delay and the reverb time settings on the front panel. These variations can then be stored in any of the 79 user memories for a total of 99 programs including the 20 presets. Programs may be selected by MIDI, a foot switch, or the infrared remote control accessory. A dual 7-band programmable graphic EQ can be used independently or in conjunction with the digital reverb to enhance the reverb sounds. The AR900 with its wide selection of useful programs has numerous application in both the studio and on stage."

== AR900 Features ==
The technical specification of the AR900 are as follows:

- 8 program algorithms, 12 factory variations provide a selection of simulated ambient environments
- Independent dual 7-band graphic equalizer (100 Hz, 300 Hz, 600 Hz, 1.5 kHz, 3 kHz, 6 kHz, 10 kHz)
- Sampling resolution and frequency: 16 bit PCM, 39.0625 kHz
- Pre delay time: 0.01-210 msec.
- Reverb time: 1-16 sec.
- Equalizer section: 7-band 2-channel graphic equalizer. ±12db
- Frequency response-Dry: 20 Hz~25 kHz, ±3db
- Frequency response-Effect: 30 Hz~16 kHz, ±2db
- Connectors: LOOP SEND x2, LOOP RECEIVE x2, REV IN x2, EQ OUT x2
- Programs: Standard: 1~8; Factory variations: 9~20; User memories: 21~99
- Dimensions: 482.6(W) x 47.7(H) x 300(D)mm (EIA 1U rackmount)
- Weight: 4 kg

According to an article from the French version of Keyboard magazine of September 1989: The AR900 offers a realtime stereo Spectrum Analyzer. An extension of the EQ tool, the analyzer's frequencies are represented graphically on the LCD, with each dot having a precision of 3db, when used in stereo, and 1.5db when used one channel at a time.

4 parameters can be edited for change the settings : Pre-Delay, Rev.Time, HF Damp. and LF Cutoff (under 100 Hz).

The device responds to SySex and the function DUMP can be used to Save or Load, 1 or All programs.
