= Akai S3000XL =

Sampler

S3000XL
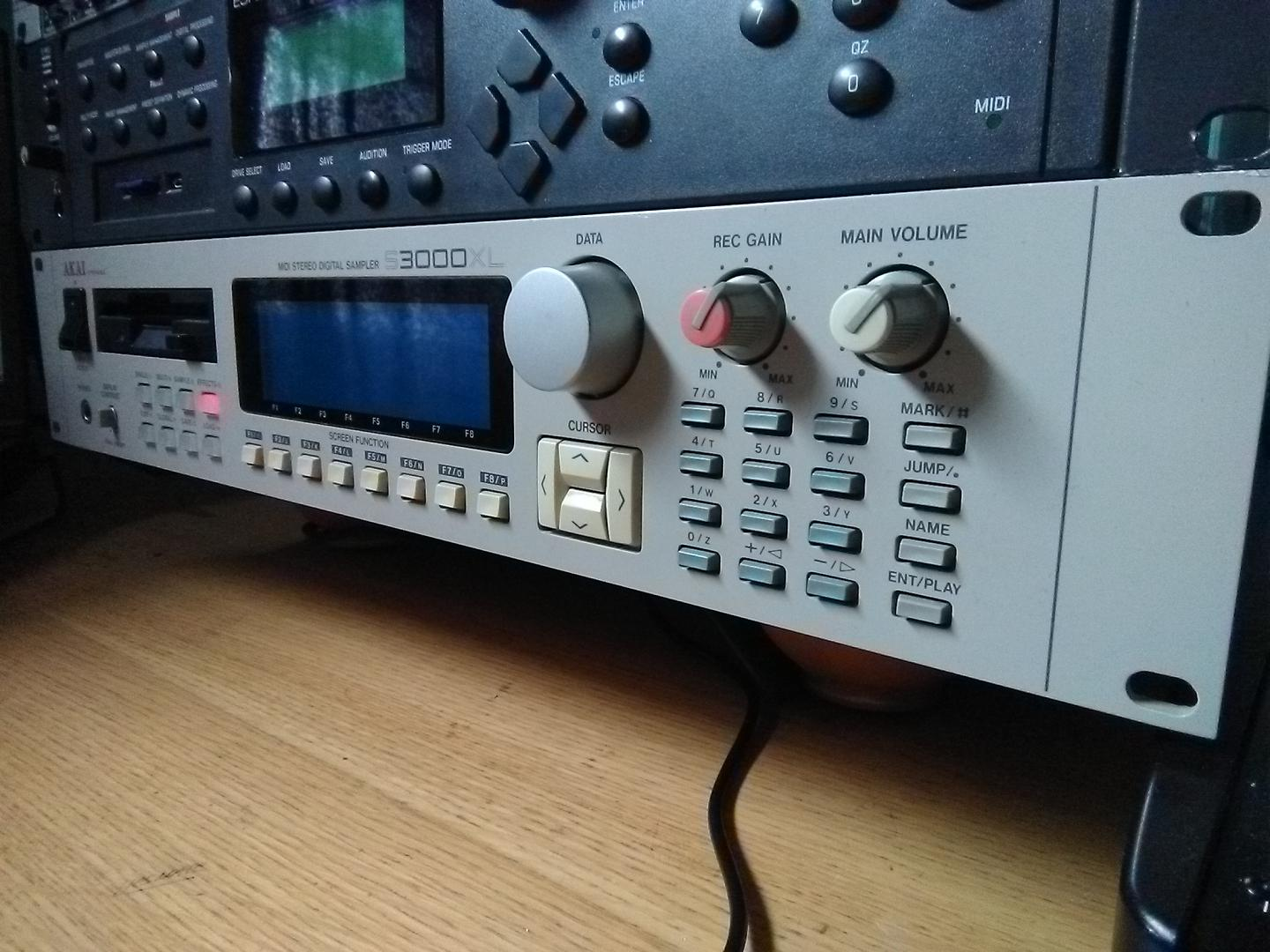
- Akai S3000XL
- Manufacturer: Akai
- Dates: 1995
- Price: ~£1800/£2000 new, ~£150 used

Technical specifications
- Polyphony: 32
- Timbrality: 16
- LFO: 2
- Synthesis type: Digital Sample-based Subtractive
- Attenuator: 4
- Storage memory: 2MB (32MB upgrade option)
- Effects: none (4 × 50 EB16 option)

Input/output
- Keyboard: none
- Left-hand control: none
- External control: MIDI {In, Out, Thru)

The Akai S3000XL is a sampler (electronic instrument that records and plays back music samples) with 32 polyphonic voices, and 2 MB of built-in RAM.

It is one of the most versatile and useful samplers produced, primarily due to the large screen and easy-to-navigate interface allowing for quick and in-depth sample editing. However, the LCD screen's backlight fades easily and the memory capacity is comparatively small by today's standards.

Although Akai has discontinued production and product support for the S3000XL, many working units can still be found in recording studios around the world.

== Technical specifications ==
For adding sounds to the sampler, the S3000XL features a 3.5" floppy drive that reads Akai-formatted floppies, and a SCSI port which allows for connection to an external storage device (such as a zip drive or external hard disk), a CD reader, or a computer for editing samples via the MESA editor. The device can also play back MIDI files, which is useful during live performances, as the Akai can take the role of the computer to trigger internal samples or external MIDI devices. The built-in 2 MB of RAM can be upgraded up to 32 using 2 16 MB SIMMs that Akai provided; other upgrades include cards such as the EB-16 effects board and the IB-304f filter board.

The S3000XL has 8 outputs, and two 1/4" phone connector inputs, which meant that it could also operate as a hard disk recorder. The front panel consists of 32 buttons (eight of which are function keys), three knobs, and a four-key directional pad for navigating the 240×64 display, which is located in the upper-middle portion of the sampler.

== Similar models ==
The S2000 is a stripped down budget version of the S3000XL featuring a smaller 2×16 character LCD and no internal SCSI connector; it was usually sold with no options installed. Regardless, it is functionally similar and accepts the S3000XL options listed below (sans internal hard disk), including the IB-208P 8-channel output board, which is exclusive to the S2000.

== Options ==
- Akai EB16 "SampleVerb" 4 × 50 effects board
- Akai FMX008 8MB Non-Volatile Flash ROM
- Akai IB304f "ProFilter" filter board
- Akai MESA editor
- Akai OS v2.0
- Akai SHD524 524MB 2.5" SCSI Hard Disk
