= Akai SG01v =

- Manufacturer: Akai
- Dates: 1995

Technical specifications
- Polyphony: 32 voices
- Timbrality: 16 parts
- Oscillator: 1 PCM
- LFO: 1 modulator
- Synthesis type: PCM rompler
- Filter: Low pass
- Aftertouch expression: yes
- Storage memory: 6MB (256 waveforms at 16-bit resolution)

Input/output
- Keyboard: no

The Akai SG01v is a ROMpler, meaning that it plays prerecorded samples stored on a ROM chip, as opposed to generating sound through onboard signal generators. The unit was produced by Akai in 1995.

== Description ==
It is housed in a 1U half-rack chassis and can be controlled through General MIDI messages. The SG01v has 32 voice polyphony and 16 part multi-timbrality. Considering the technology of the day, the SG01v reproduces with surprising fidelity the sounds of even older analogue synthesizers, as well as two drum kits. The "V" designation in the model name denotes "vintage" sounds. The model line also includes an SG01k ("K" for "keys"), which was strictly a General MIDI module, and an SG01p ("P" for "piano").

=== Front panel ===
The front panel contains a three digit, seven-segment LED display and a volume control button. Basic editing can be done via the seven control buttons on the front of the unit.

=== Back panel ===
- MIDI interface
- Main out
- Headphones
- Power supply

=== Hardware ===
The main processor in the SG01V is an NEC D70236, and the digital-to-audio converter (DAC) is an NEC UPD63210GT.

=== Sounds ===
The unit contains 256 preset patches and two drum kits. Patches emulate the sounds of models from such manufacturers as Roland, Moog, Oberheim, PPG, Solina. The drum kits emulate the styles of electronic kits like the Roland TR-808 and Roland TR-909, as well as Simmons drum kits.

=== PSU ===
The SG01V uses a 10V DC external power supply.

=== Dimensions ===
Dimensions: Width 214mm, Height 257.6mm, Depth 43.7mm.
