= Akai S900 =

1986 12-bit professional digital sampler

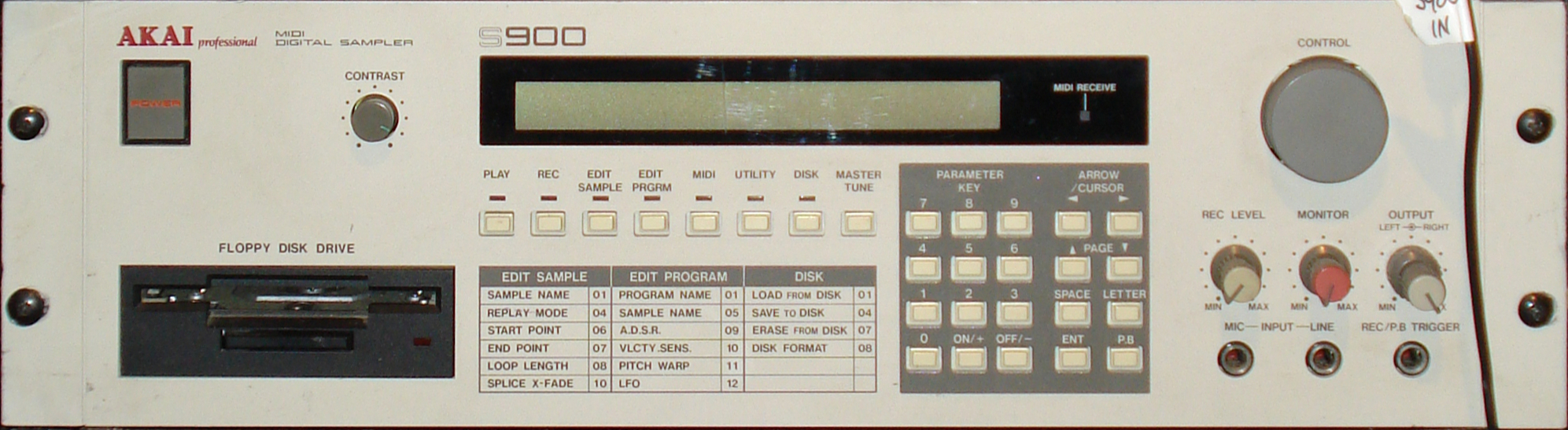
- Akai S900 MIDI Digital Sampler
- Manufacturer: Akai
- Dates: 1986

Technical specifications
- Polyphony: 8 voices
- Timbrality: 8 parts
- Synthesis type: Digital Sample-based Subtractive
- Storage memory: 896KiB (768KiB for samples)

Input/output
- External control: MIDI

The Akai S900 is a 12-bit sampler, with a variable sample rate from 7.5 kHz through to 40 kHz. It was common in recording studios until it was superseded two years later by the S1000.

Version 1.2 of the S900's internal firmware added support for loading operating-system upgrades from floppy disk. Akai's final known disk-based release was version 4.0. Its disk image was later preserved and distributed with AkaiSeX, an Atari utility for reading and writing Akai sampler disks. An unofficial third-party operating-system version, SUPER4.0.2, was released on 23 July 2026.

An expanded version, the Akai S950, was released in 1988 alongside the higher-end S1000. The S950 imported some of the S1000's improvements, including timestretching (allowing the user to change a sample's length and pitch independently of one another), and it increased the maximum sample rate to 48 kHz. Unlike the S1000 series, the S900 series allows a sample to loop alternating forwards and backwards.

Notable users include The 45 King (who named his hit "The 900 Number" after the sampler), Juan Atkins, Beatmasters, Black Box, Ian Boddy, Enya, Fatboy Slim (who nearly exclusively uses a pair of S950s), Front 242, KLF, The Bomb Squad, Prince Paul, Renegade Soundwave, Michael Gira and Tangerine Dream.
