= Grande Holdings =

Audio electronics manufacturer

Grande Holdings Ltd (Chinese: 嘉域集團有限公司) (SEHK: 186) is the original name of Nimble Holdings, a Chinese manufacturer of consumer and professional audio and HiFi components based in Kowloon, Hong Kong.

In the past, Grande Holdings has purchased several Japanese HiFi manufacturers, including Akai and Nakamichi. It also owns Kawa, a Chinese domestic hifi company, and has owned Singer Corporation, a company best known for its sewing machines. The company has since sold off Singer as a brand.

== History ==
The company was founded by James Ting, a Chinese businessman originally from Shanghai, Christopher Ho, and Stanley Ho (Chinese: 何鴻燊; pinyin: Hé Hóngshēn), Macau's richest and most famous entrepreneurs. In 1999 prior to the collapse of International Semi Tech Microsystems, Grande Holdings acquired Singer, Pfaff, Akai and Sansui Electric assets. Singer and Pfaff were later sold off to SVP Worldwide.

== Controversy ==
In 1999 during the Asian Financial Crisis the company courted controversy when one of its main subsidiaries in Hong Kong, Akai Holdings Ltd, fell apart after recording a $1.65 billion loss in 1999, one of the biggest losses in Asian financial history. It resulted in Grande Holdings becoming almost bankrupt, and having to sell many of its subsidiaries and business interests to recoup its loss.

Regulators and officials in the bankruptcy court had found the company's subsidiary, Akai Holdings Ltd, and its Singer division, had made a number of complex company cross-selling deals which resulted in the destabilisation of Singer and Akai. Officials, through their findings, had found Akai's directors and staff had left their Hong Kong offices, and also found that some $38.5 million had mysteriously disappeared from Akai's funds. It was speculated the money was either siphoned away by employees, or deposited in overseas bank accounts.

In November 1999, and after the bankruptcy proceedings, many of Akai's remaining assets mysteriously shifted to Grande Holdings, without any notification to the Hong Kong Stock Exchange, creditors, courts, or other regulatory authorities. The deal was done through a simple and hastily prepared four-page management agreement.

Creditors for Akai say they only learned of the change in corporate ownership in September 2000, when Grande Holdings presented 54 boxes of Akai records to liquidators. Grande Holdings then executive director Samuel K. Yuen denied in a brief telephone interview that Grande had taken over Akai.

== Grande Holdings today ==
Following a series of losses, Grande had reached insolvency and appointed provisional liquidators on 1 June 2011. At the time of filing, the company controlled the Akai and Nakamichi brands as well as its key assets, including a TV factory in Zhongshan, China. The company also owns Ross Group plc, a transformer manufacturer in the United Kingdom, majority ownership of Emerson Radio, and Kawa a Chinese brand of electronics. The company is currently incorporated in Bermuda as an exempted company with limited liability. The company changed its name to Nimble Holdings in 2018.
