= Akai VK =

Videocassette format

- Media type: Magnetic tape
- Encoding: NTSC, PAL
- Read mechanism: Helical scan
- Write mechanism: Helical scan
- Standard: 525-line, 625-line
- Developed by: Akai
- Usage: Home movies
- Released: Late 1970s

VK is a helical scan analog recording videocassette format developed by Akai in the late 1970s, that is capable of recording and playing back black & white (and later color) video in either EIA (a.k.a. RS-170, the 525-line NTSC video standard for North America, Canada, Mexico, & Japan) and CCIR (the 625-line PAL/SECAM video standard for Europe and other parts of the world) systems.

== Overview ==
The format employed 1/2-inch-wide (13 mm) magnetic tape loaded into a small cassette, and had two video record heads on the scanner. The units had an optional RF modulator to play back to a TV set as well as a detachable video monitor.

A professional 12-track audio recorder/mixer model Akai MG1212 was made which utilised the same tape running at 19 cm/s.

Akai's plant for the manufacture of VK VCRs was located in Tokyo, Japan. A VK video cassette could record up to 30 minutes of video.

== Early B&W models ==
- VTS-300 – ½" B&W Video Cassette portable VTR.

It came with a camera, model number VC-300.

- VT-350 – ½" B&W Video Cassette portable VTR.

Weighed 24 pounds, without the battery.
It came with a camera also.
A monitor could be added to the side of the VTR.

== Color model ==
- VT-400
- Akai model # VT-400 last VK VTR. It recorded color composite video on 1/2 30 minute VK-30 cassette of videotape. Could record and playback B&W or color. Came with a hand-held VC-400 tube camera with a zoom lens. The system was very small and lightweight for its time. One cable to connect the ENG camera to the VTR for power, video and the Microphone audio. This model was available in NTSC, PAL and SECAM.

== Video cassette ==
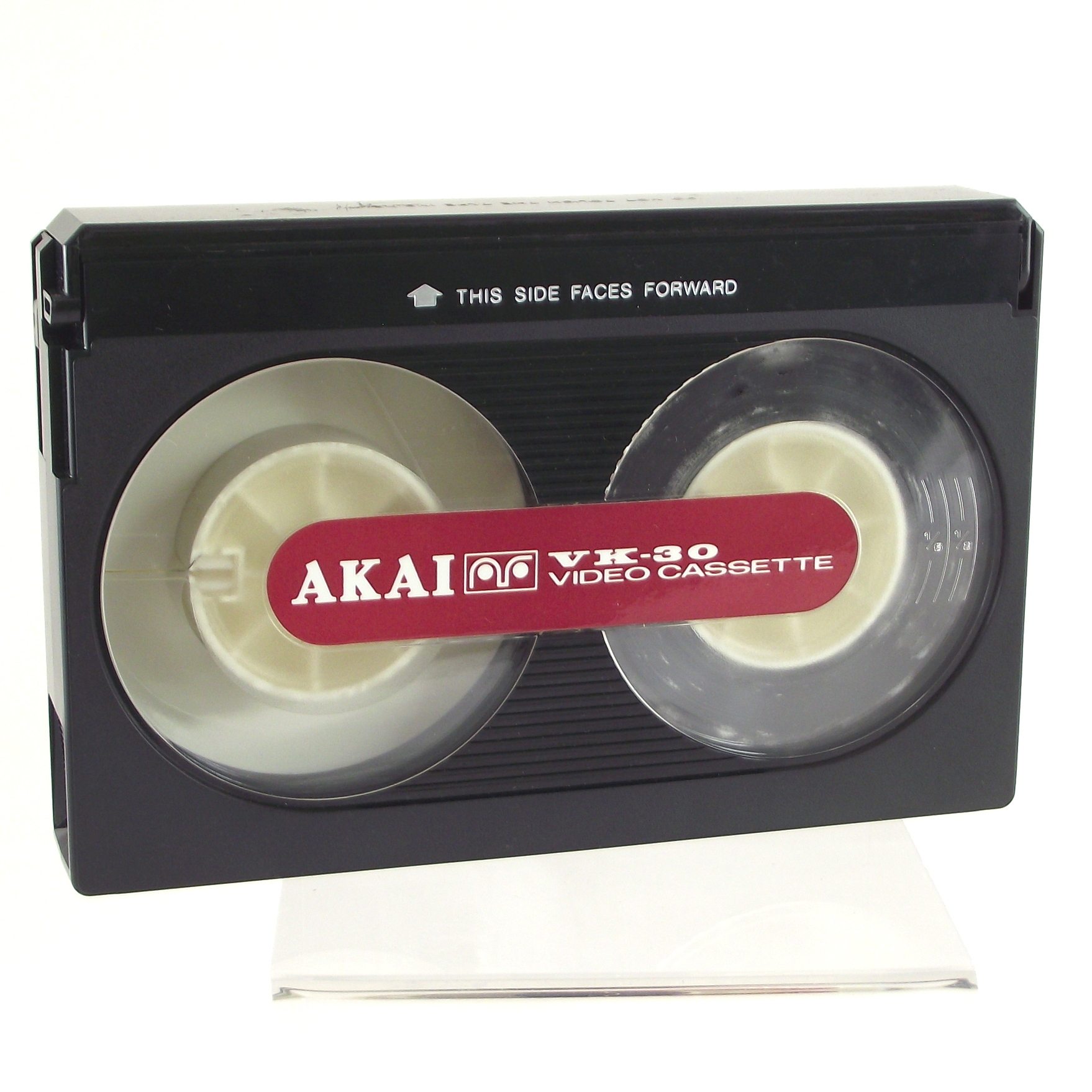
Akai VK-30 video cassette

* Both units used the 30 minute VK-30 cassette.

- The VK-30 looked similar to a Betamax cassette.

Not many VK VCR systems were sold. The 30-minute record limit of the VK systems and the introduction of new systems on the market (VHS and Betamax) with longer record time limited VK sales.

== See also ==
- 1/4 inch Akai
