= Akai X7000 =

- Manufacturer: Akai
- Dates: 1986
- Price: £999.99 GBP $1450 US

Technical specifications
- Polyphony: 6 voices
- Timbrality: Multitimbral
- LFO: 1 sine modulator
- Filter: Digitally controlled analog low-pass
- Aftertouch expression: No
- Velocity expression: Yes
- Storage memory: 448K internal RAM, 2.8" Quick Disk external storage

Input/output
- Keyboard: 61 keys
- External control: MIDI

The Akai X7000 is a 61 key sampling keyboard from Akai. It was released in 1986 and one of the first major samplers released by Akai. It was a 12 bit sampler with 6 voices of polyphony, and included functions such as sample tuning, truncating, reversing and looping. The unit features both microphone and line inputs, and a one line, 16 character LCD screen. For storage, the X7000 uses 2.8" Quick Disks to maintain backwards compatibility with the S612.

== Sampling ==
By default, the X7000 holds 6 samples. Each sample can have a sample rate of between 4 kHz and 32 kHz, and memory is split between the 6 samples. At the lowest sample rate, the maximum time per sample is 8 seconds, and lowering the sample rate will increase the amount of time available. After recording, the X7000 will automatically find a suitable loop point if possible. Samples can also be destructively overdubbed, which allows for layering effects to be achieved.

== Enhanced editing ==
Editing of the samples is performed via the menu buttons, rotary encoder and LCD screen. The start and end time of a sample can be adjusted, and playback modes include one-shot, looping, alternating and drum trigger. Samples can also be reversed and downsampled. In later versions of the X7000, crossfade looping was also added.

== Expandability ==
The X7000 is expandable to 16 samples using the ASK70 optional board, which retailed for £149. Installing this board will increase the amount of samples, but the polyphony will remain unaffected. The device can also be connected to an AX73 (or the rack-mount version, VX90) for further processing, or to a mixer using an optional breakout cable, which splits the 6 voices into their own outputs.

== S700 ==
A rack-mount version was released alongside the X7000 called the S700. Its specifications were identical, and it used the same 2.8" disk drive. Like the X7000, it could also be expanded to 16 samples using the ASK70 board.

== Notable users ==
- The Chemical Brothers
- Orbital
