= Akai S1000 =

1988 16-bit professional stereo digital sampler

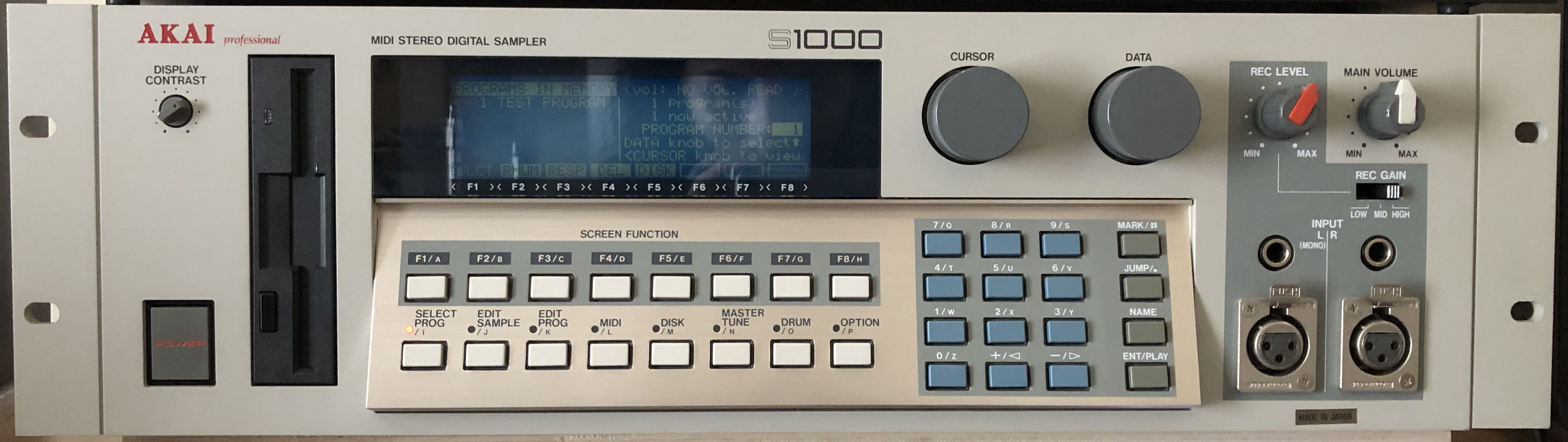
- Akai S1000 MIDI Stereo Digital Sampler
- Manufacturer: Akai
- Dates: 1988 - 1993
- Price: $5,999 Original MSRP

Technical specifications
- Polyphony: 16 voices
- Timbrality: 16 parts
- Oscillator: 16 total, 1 per voice (Saw Down, Saw Up, Sine, Square)
- LFO: 3 LFOs
- Synthesis type: Digital Sample-based Subtractive
- Filter: 18dB/octave non-resonant digital
- Storage memory: 2MB (expandable to 32MB - originally 8MB maximum)
- Effects: None

Input/output
- Keyboard: 61-key (S1000KB only)
- External control: MIDI

The Akai S1000 is a 16-bit, 44.1 kHz professional stereo digital sampler, released by Akai in 1988. The S1000 was among the first professional-quality 16-bit stereo samplers. Its abilities to splice, crossfade, trim, and loop sound in 16-bit CD quality made it popular among producers in the late 80s through to the mid 90s. The S1000 used 24-bit internal processing, had digital filters and an effects send and return, and came with 2MB of RAM (expandable to 8MB, and 32MB after the introduction of the EXM008 RAM boards for the S1100 in 1990).

Version 2.0 of the S1000's operating system introduced primitive timestretching, allowing a sound's pitch and length to be altered independently of one another. Far from seamless, this distinctive sound became popular in its own right, featured on songs such as "Higher State of Consciousness" and "RipGroove".

== Variants ==
Several variations of the S1000 were produced:

- The S1000HD included an internal 40MB hard disk
- The S1000KB was built into a keyboard, and included room for an internal 80MB hard disk
- The S1000PB was a playback-only version that couldn't create new samples
- The S1100, released in 1990, was an expanded and enhanced version of the S1000 including effects and SCSI interface; original MSRP $4,999
- The S1100EX (Expander) was a playback-only rack module for the S1100 that expanded polyphony, multitimbrality, and effects, but lacked its own front panel interface. Its original MSRP was $2,999

== Expansion cards ==
The following expansion cards are available to upgrade the abilities of any S1000 series sampler:

- EXM005 2MB RAM (an additional three can be fitted, for 8MB RAM in total)
- EXM008 8MB RAM, released in 1990 (up to four can be fitted, for 32MB RAM in total)
- IB 102 Atari / Supra hard disk interface
- IB 103 SCSI interface
- IB 104 AES/EBU digital interface

== Legacy ==
The S1000 quickly displaced the S900 as the studio standard sampler. Many bedroom producers could make music using little more than an S1000 and an Atari ST to sequence it, and in the UK this combination was a popular way of producing music in genres from jungle to speed garage.

In an interview conducted over ten years after the S1000's release, Boards of Canada's Michael Sandison said "We have five or six samplers, but my favorite by far is still the Akai S1000. It's an old tank now, and the screen has faded so that I almost can't read it, but I know it inside out. It's the most spontaneous thing for making up little tunes." Conversely, Portishead's Dave McDonald simply called it a "horrible thing" due to its primitive interface.

== Notable users ==
Notable users include 808 State, Boards of Canada, Bomb the Bass, Cabaret Voltaire, The Chemical Brothers, Crystal Method, Depeche Mode, Duran Duran, The Future Sound of London, Garbage, Michael Jackson, Jean-Michel Jarre, Meat Beat Manifesto, Moby, My Bloody Valentine, Gary Numan, Nine Inch Nails (S1100), Orchestral Manoeuvres in the Dark, Pet Shop Boys, Portishead, Primal Scream, The Prodigy, Public Enemy, The Sisters of Mercy, The Stone Roses, System 7, Tears for Fears, Tricky, Vangelis, and Vince Clarke.
