= Nakamichi =

Japanese consumer electronics brand

Nakamichi Corporation Limited
- Company type: Subsidiary of Nimble Holdings
- Industry: Electronics
- Founded: in Tokyo, Japan during 1948; 78 years ago
- Key people: Takeshi Nakamichi (President)
- Products: Hi-fi equipment
- Parent: Grande Holdings
- Website: www.nakamichi.com, www.nakamichi-usa.com

Nakamichi Corp., Ltd. (株式会社ナカミチ, Kabushiki-Gaisha Nakamichi) was a Japanese consumer electronics brand which gained a name from the 1970s onwards for audio cassette decks. Nakamichi is now a subsidiary of Chinese holding company Nimble Holdings.

Nakamichi manufactured electronic devices from its founding in 1948 but only began selling them under its name from 1972. It is credited with offering the world's first three-head cassette deck. Since 1999, under Chinese ownership, the product range has included home cinema audio systems, sound bars, speakers, headphones, mini hi-fi systems, automotive stereo products and video DVD products.

== Background ==
Etsuro Nakamichi founded Nakamichi in 1948 as Nakamichi Research Corporation Ltd (中道研究所株式会社 Nakamichi Kenkyujo Kabushiki Kaisha) in Tokyo, Japan. It specialized in manufacturing portable radios, tonearms, loudspeakers, and communications equipment. It was later headed by the founder's younger brother Niro Nakamichi. The company was originally established as a research and development firm in electronics and optics but later became known as a manufacturer of quality audio products. While its cassette decks were particularly well known, the company is also credited with audio innovations, such as self-centering record players, high-end DAT recorders, and ultra-compact slot-loading CD changers.

In the 1950s, Nakamichi developed one of the first open reel tape recorders in Japan under the Magic Tone brand. In 1957, it developed and made its own magnetic tape heads, as well as launching the Fidela 3-head Open Reel Stereo Tape Deck.

Because of its experience in manufacturing magnetic tape heads and equipment, in 1967 the company started making tape decks for a number of foreign manufacturers including Harman Kardon, KLH, Advent, Fisher, ELAC, Sylvania, Concord, Ampex and Motorola.

From 1973, Nakamichi started to sell high-quality stereo cassette decks that benefited from the mass market's move away from reel-to-reel tape recorders to the cassette format. The Nakamichi 1000 and 700, made in the mid-1970s, had three heads, a dual capstan drive that reduced wow and flutter, and Dolby-B noise reduction to improve the signal-to-noise ratio. The dual capstan drive ensured superior head-to-tape contact, essentially eliminating reliance on the problematic spring pressure pads built into cassette housings (later models were fitted with pressure pad lifters that further improved tape travel stability and reduced head wear). High-end features of these models included adjustable record head azimuth and Dolby calibration. The relatively high retail price of the 1000 and 700 prompted Nakamichi to offer lower-priced two-head models, such as the Nakamichi 500 and the wedge-shaped 600.

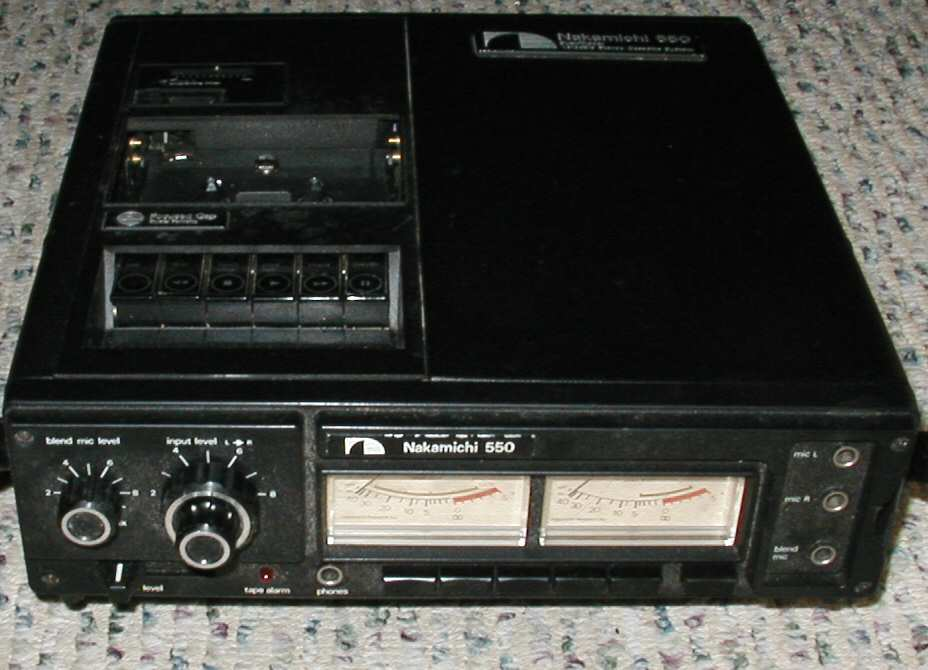
A Nakamichi 550. Portable, though the size and weight of an early VCR.

The Nakamichi 550 was a portable cassette recorder that had three microphone inputs: one for left channel, one for right channel, and one for a center blend channel. This recorder could run from batteries or AC and was used to make high quality recordings in the field.

In the late 1970s, Nakamichi updated and broadened its model range, with revised products including the Nakamichi 1000-II, the 700-II, and the lower-end 600-II. Nakamichi branched out into other audio components such as pre-amplifiers, power-amplifiers, tuners, receivers and later speakers.

In the early 1980s, Nakamichi's top-of-the-line cassette deck was the 1000ZXL, retailing at US$3,800, its price only exceeded by the 1000ZXL Limited at US$6,000. The updated 700ZXL sold for US$3,000, but Nakamichi also offered lower-end cassette decks under US$300. This time marked a peak in the market for cassette recorders, before it lost ground to digital recording media such as CD.

== Notable Nakamichi products and advances ==
=== Three-head cassette decks ===
Nakamichi was the first to use a three-head recording technique in a cassette deck. Separate tape heads were used for playback, recording, and erase. Previously the playback and recording functions were combined in a single tape head. The three-head mechanism allowed higher quality reproduction as well as the ability to hear a recording in progress - as the tape traveled past the recording head onto the playback head.

The first Nakamichi three-head decks were the 1000 and 700 introduced around 1973. The 1000 and 700 series decks had tape bias settings for normal bias (IEC TYPE I) and high bias (IEC TYPE II). Competitor cassette decks offered Ferri Chrome (IEC TYPE III) whereas Nakamichi chose not to do so. The settings for the normal and high bias were labeled as EX and SX respectively. Nakamichi also sold its own brand of blank cassette tapes.

Around 1978, when metal bias (IEC TYPE IV) cassettes came into the market, Nakamichi produced some early metal tape capable decks such as the 580M. The tape settings on these decks were EX (normal bias), SX (high bias), and ZX (metal bias).

Around 1980, Nakamichi introduced the third generation of 1000 and 700 three-head decks. The 1000ZXL and 700ZXL had full metal capability as well as normal and high bias abilities and had built-in computers for calibrating the decks to a specific tape. These built-in computers were known as A.B.L.E. for Azimuth, Bias, Level, and Equalization. The user would use this function (activated by an "Auto Cal" button) to optimize the deck to a specific brand of tape to get best recording results from every cassette. Hence the 1000ZXL and 700ZXL were known as computing cassette decks. Also offered was a third less costly deck the 700ZXE auto tuning cassette deck.

A more expensive 1000ZXL Limited was also offered, with the same specifications as the 1000ZXL but with a gold-plated face. Other high performance Nakamichi cassette decks are the CR-1 (2 head), CR-2 (2 head), CR-3 (3 head), CR-4 (3 head), CR-5 (3 head), CR-7 (3 head), LX-3 (2 head), LX-5 (3 head), Cassette Deck 1 and the Cassette Deck 1 Limited. Like the 1000ZXL Limited, the Cassette Deck 1 Limited is more expensive than the regular Cassette Deck 1.

=== Flip-Auto Reverse ===
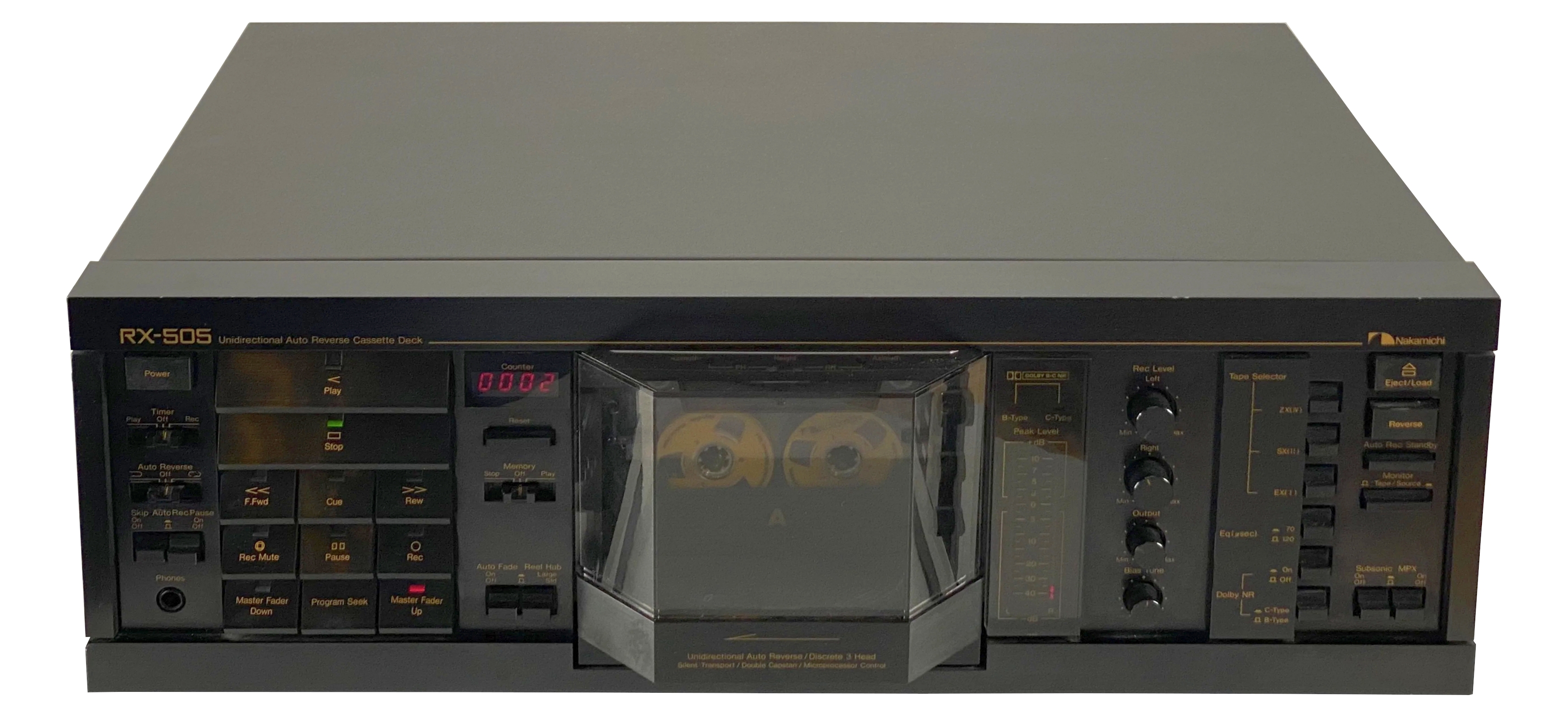
Nakamichi RX-505 audio cassette deck with UDAR.

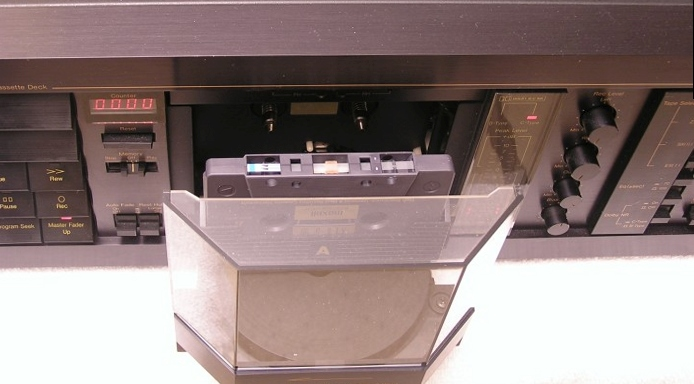
Top view of UDAR mechanism.

Called "UDAR" for Unidirectional Auto Reverse. Used on the Nakamichi RX series of decks. With the advent of auto-reverse (playing the tape in both directions), Nakamichi had long recognized that the angle of the tape passing over the playback head was not the same if the tape head was rotated in the opposite direction and its first approach was to track the azimuth on the tape itself by moving the head slightly—a very complex affair which led to the design of the Dragon with its NAAC. Nakamichi subsequently abandoned this approach and set its engineers in search of a more elegant solution. Nakamichi soon developed its UDAR mechanism, which mimicked the way people had manually turned over their tapes in the past: a mechanical system that would eject the tape, spin it around and reload it into the deck. It was available on all Nakamichi RX series of tape decks, i.e., the RX-202, RX-303 and RX-505. The 'top of the range' RX-505 was made after the Dragon. It had only one rewind and forward operation in a unique unidirectional auto-reverse deck. It also had an updated and simpler drive system that was more direct loading, had updated and quieter electronics, and its revised capstan is essentially what Nakamichi used for its 1988 Nakamichi 1000 DAT recorder.

=== Tape pressure pad lifter ===
A cassette tape contains a "pressure pad" of some type, usually made of felt. This pad is within the cassette tape shell (located just behind the tape opening) and opposes the magnetic head of the cassette deck, providing pressure against the head(s) when the tape is being played. Nakamichi found that this pad provided uneven and fairly inaccurate pressure and was therefore inadequate for reliable tape/head contact. Furthermore, Nakamichi found that the pressure pad was a source of audible noise, particularly scrape flutter (the tape bouncing across the head, a result of uneven pressure), and also contributed to premature head wear. Nakamichi's dual-capstan tape decks provide a more accurate tape tension, so that unlike other decks, the cassette's pressure pad is not needed at all. To remedy this problem, the vast majority of Nakamichi dual-capstan decks contain a "cage" around the record/playback heads that lifts the pressure pad out of the way so that the deck itself—specifically, the dual capstan mechanism—is able to maintain much more consistent tape tension and tape/head contact during playback.

=== The Dragon and special products ===
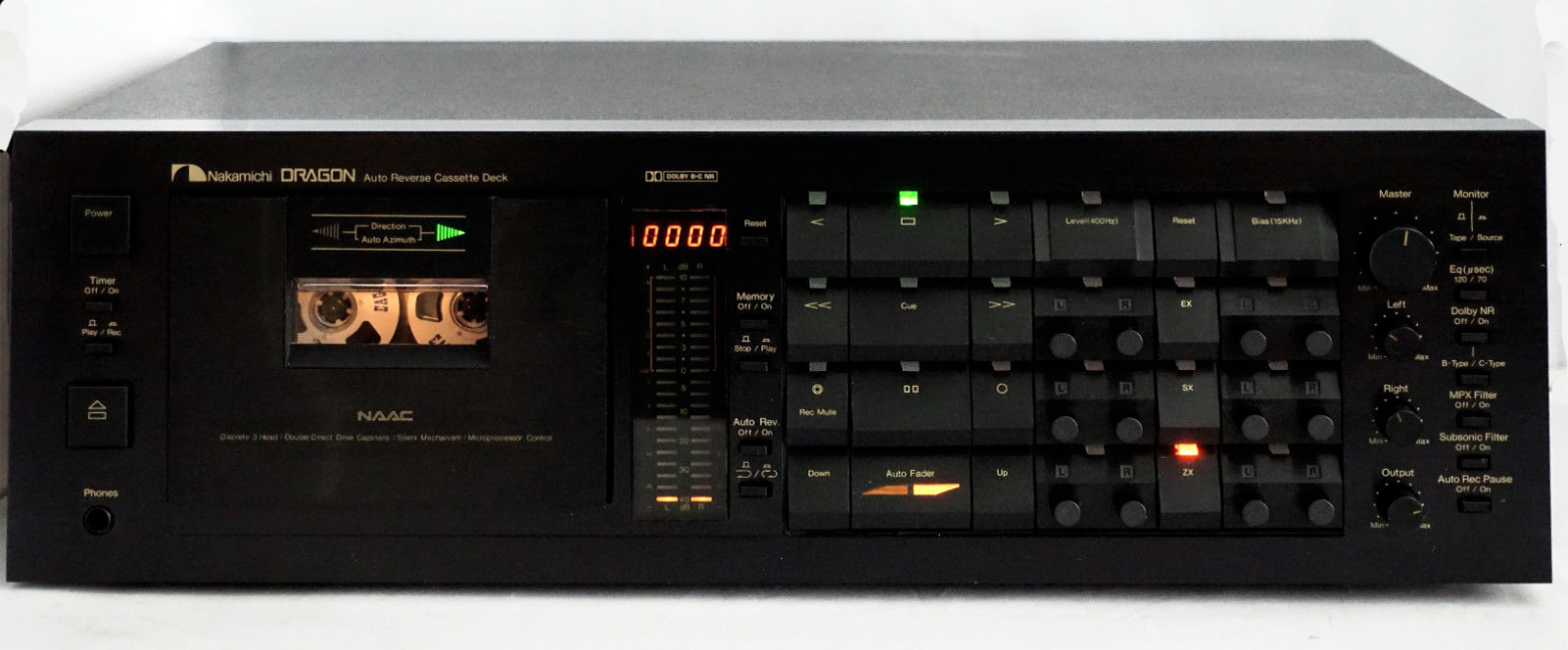
Nakamichi Dragon

In the CD era (post 1983), the top line Nakamichi products were termed the "Dragon." The Dragon-CT turntable ("Computing Turntable") automatically adjusted for off-center holes in records by moving the platter in two dimensions. The Dragon CD playing system has special mechanical damping to prevent vibrations of the CD and holds multiple CDs. The Dragon cassette deck used a special circuit for azimuth adjustment called "Nakamichi Automatic Azimuth Correction" (NAAC) to find the best sound for each recorded cassette tape, however because it was both expensive to manufacture and more complex as well as difficult to both service and maintain, Nakamichi sought to produce a new deck with the same accuracy of azimuth but without the associated costs and difficulties of servicing. The solution (thought by some to be a gimmick) was to automate the manual turnover of tape; in other words, eject the tape and flip it around to maintain proper tape head alignment. Nakamichi did this with its RX series. The RX-505 is not a compromise as many assumed but a better method of maintaining azimuth without using the costly, complex and somewhat fragile NAAC system even though the Akai GXC-65D was the first cassette deck to actually use this method where the cassette would flip over instead of the head being rotated but was done in a top-loading fashion as this were cassette decks from the early-mid 1970s.

Other products from Nakamichi did not acquire the "Dragon" name but were still notable. These include the Nakamichi 1000 series products with the 1000ZXL cassette deck being more advanced and expensive than the Dragon cassette deck. The Nakamichi 1000 digital audio tape transport and Nakamichi 1000p digital to audio converter system were Nakamichi's reference digital audio tape components. These components were intended to establish Nakamichi's dominance in the field of digital audio tape (DAT), but DAT was not widely adopted by audiophiles, as the format itself did not gain acceptance as an industry standard.

=== Stasis Series amplifiers ===
Nakamichi licensed "Stasis" technology from powerhouse amplifier manufacturer Threshold (a class-A amplifier circuit by Nelson Pass, then a designer at Threshold, now at Pass Labs). This circuit was used in a line of expensive Nakamichi PA series of power-amplifiers, such as the PA-5 and PA-7, as well as its SR and TA series of receivers.

=== Car stereo products ===
In the early 1980s, Nakamichi introduced a line of car stereo products. In 1982, the flagship head unit was the TD-1200 cassette receiver which incorporated a drawer-mounted, top-loading cassette mechanism with NAAC (like the Dragon), Dolby B and Dolby C.

The TD-800 was introduced in 1984, a nearly identical cassette receiver, however, implementing a much simpler transport without manual tape reverse and known for extreme reliability, a highly sought after vintage car audio piece.

Other early products included the TD-500 and TD-700 cassette receivers with manual azimuth adjustment (similar to the Cassette Deck 1, Cassette Deck 1 Limited, DR-1 and the CR-7). Several generations of power amplifier and speakers were introduced over time.

In the early 1990s, Nakamichi was one of the first companies to produce automotive CD changers that loaded multiple discs via a single slot rather than a CD cartridge.

Toyota would choose Nakamichi along with Pioneer to manufacture the audio systems for its range of Lexus automobiles. The Nakamichi unit was the flagship audio system offered to Lexus buyers, and this partnership lasted from 1989 to 2001.

Another follow-on flagship head unit was the TP-1200, which consisted of a head unit and a separate 'black box' pre-amp section. The casing for both units was made from machined aluminum, and the internal circuitry for both units was suspended using a mechanical suspension system. The head unit contained a diversity tuner and display unit only. The pre-amp section performed input switching, volume and tone adjustment. The tone controls (bass-mid-treble) were motor driven analog controls while the volume, balance and fader were digital.

Other products of note were the 100pa amplifier and the limited-edition version the 1000pa. Both were identical in specifications (4x50wrms) and internal layout, the only difference being the case color. The 100pa was silver and the 1000pa black. The mobile TD-560 was a versatile pull-out-of-dash and remote-controlled cassette and FM tuner head unit, that performed at a level comparable to the best Nakamichi mobile decks of the late 1980s era. Revolutionary was Nakamichi's mobile PA-350 four channel power amplifiers, with discrete amplifiers and high performance specifications.

In 1989 Nakamichi, along with Pioneer, teamed with Toyota Corp. to produce a premium sound system in its Lexus line of automobiles. In 1990, Nakamichi introduced the music bank in its CD players which was based on a single loading tray concept with a total capacity of 7 CDs. This differed from the rest of the industry which typically offered a self-loading magazine or a carousel. Nakamichi further enhanced the music bank system in its 1992 offering (MB line) touting the quickest changer in the market. However, the quick changer concept experienced frequent jamming in its machines and as a result, required the company to redesign the mechanism in 1994 with a slight delay during the loading process. While this was corrected, Nakamichi's footing in the digital age was not concrete. In fact, its presence in the rapidly growing audio/video arena was modest at best with its Sansui sourced AV-1 and AV-2 receivers (introduced in 1991). Further impacting its audio reputation was the ending of the licensing agreement with Nelson Pass for the use of the Stasis technology. Without it, its line of preamplifiers and power amplifiers were compromised; its technological advantage, more important in the high-end audio market, was lost. Nakamichi attempted to counter the loss with its receivers touting Harmonic Time Alignment (HTA).

=== Nakamichi Harmonic Time Alignment technology ===
The time alignment of an amplified music signal and its distortion components has a profound effect on perceived sound quality. Nakamichi researchers discovered that the human ear is much more tolerant of harmonic distortion if the distortion components are time-aligned with respect to the primary signal. Nakamichi Harmonic Time Alignment (HTA) amplifiers adopt a wideband, low open loop gain design. A minimal amount of negative feedback is used, but, more important, it is kept constant over the entire audio spectrum. This assures the proper timing between the primary signal and any amplifier distortion components. The sonic benefits of this design include powerful, high-resolution bass, a natural, richly detailed midrange, and smooth, clear highs.

In layman's term, HTA masked distortion through the primary signal. While effective, total harmonic distortion for this technology was higher than Nakamichi's receivers utilizing Stasis technology. Whether sound quality improved or dissipated with this technology is left to the listener's ears.

== Decline of Nakamichi ==
Nakamichi's reputation for being the pioneer of audio cassettes no longer carried weight in the era of CDs. The lack of innovative digital technology meant Nakamichi was unable to successfully brand itself in the digital age. Further adding to its demise was a shrinking distribution channel as high-end audio boutiques were forced to close as they could not compete in a rapidly changing environment where shoppers gravitated towards electronic superstores. Ultimately, electronics consumers, who once were able to apply a significant portion of their outlay on audio-only components, needed to allocate more of their budget towards acquiring new video gear such as laser disc players, flat panel displays, DVD players, etc. In addition, a recession in the early 1990s caused many consumers to settle for mainstream electronics brands.

Toyota also stopped using Nakamichi systems in Lexus vehicles at this time, instead choosing Mark Levinson when Toyota made a deal with Harman International to provide premium audio systems in its vehicles in 2000. Bob Carter, General Manager for Lexus, also cited a lack of "resonance" with intended consumers as reasons for the switch.

By the end of 1990s, Nakamichi failed to transition properly. In 1998, it was acquired by Grande Holdings, a Chinese company based in Hong Kong. Grande Holdings included electronics companies Akai and Sansui. Niro Nakamichi left in 1998 to set up Mechanical Research Corporation.

== Nakamichi under Grande Holdings ==
The company went into bankruptcy protection on February 19, 2002. In Nakamichi's defense, many high-end audio manufacturers were also forced to merge or sell to larger holding companies during this time period partially influenced by the collapse of the Japanese "bubble economy"; such well-known companies include McIntosh and Mark Levinson.

The company emerged from bankruptcy and repositioned itself as a manufacturer of high-end "lifestyle systems" in the same manner as Bang & Olufsen. They also manufacture CD changers for hi-fi, computer, and car audio units.

In June 2006, Nakamichi released its first portable DVD player with built-in LCD screen, the Lumos.

Nakamichi Kimono 3D LED TV with slim full brushed aluminum body

From 2011, Nakamichi offered a complete line of mass market audio products, including earbuds, headphones, speakers, wireless speakers and sound bars. Also to target a younger demographic, they manufactured iPod docking systems and 3D LED TVs.

In 2014, Nakamichi moved back to its high-end roots and presented a 7.1 pre-/main Amplifier combination AV1/AVP1.

In 2016, its focus shifted to soundbars by introducing its Shockwave soundbar series. The first model, the Shockwave Pro 7.1 soundbar, was the first soundbar to have 7 discrete surround channels.

In 2018, Nakamichi added 4 more models into its Shockwave lineup, incorporating dual subwoofers, quad modular surround speaker technology and DTS:X compatibility. The flagship Shockwave Ultra 9.2 DTS:X, Shockwave Elite 7.2 DTS:X and Shockwave Plus 5.2 were the industry's first soundbars designed with two subwoofers, while the Shockwave Pro 7.1 DTS:X featured a single down-firing subwoofer. The Shockwave Ultra 9.2 DTS:X pioneered Nakamichi's quad modular surround speaker technology, of which its four surround speakers could be attached as pairs to become two sets of dipoles surround speakers, enabling the sound to reverberate off walls to create the same true surround sound environment as when the four surround speakers were placed individually. During the 2018 Consumer Electronics Show held in Las Vegas, a series of blind listening battles were conducted for the public, including 2 exclusive sessions for members of the San Francisco Audiophile Society and private sessions to the media. Out of 204 people who participated, 81% voted Nakamichi Shockwave Ultra 9.2 DTS:X Soundbar for best overall performance and 99% voted it for best overall value.

In 2019, Nakamichi released 3 new Shockwave soundbar models, the Shockwave Ultra 9.2.4 SSE, Shockwave Elite 7.2.4 SSE and Shockwave Pro 7.1.4 SSE. Besides retaining the features of the 2018 models, all of the 2019 versions are integrated with Dolby Atmos, Dolby Vision and proprietary Spatial Surround Elevation (SSE) processing technology. SSE consists of 3 processing engines - Spatial, Surround and Elevation engines - that combine to enhance the overall surround sound performance. The Spatial engine amplifies high frequencies from the input audio signal and engages the high-frequency tweeters on the soundbar and rear/surround speakers to enlarge the spaciousness of the sound. The Surround engine utilizes up mixing, volume and phase improvements to the input audio signal to optimize the clarity and balance of the surround sound. The Elevation engine stables the processing of 3D object-based content including Dolby Atmos and DTS:X and interlaces a height effects sound layer into each of the 12-16 speaker drivers (12 for 7.1.4/7.2.4 SSE and 16 for 9.2.4 SSE) located around the user.

Nakamichi's shockwave Ultra 9.2 SSE Soundbar System was named a CES 2019 Innovation Awards Honoree. In addition, it won a blind listening contest against the market's flagship Dolby Atmos soundbars that was voted by the public and hosted by Brian Tong, an ex-CNET tech editor.

In 2023, Nakamichi unveiled the Nakamichi DRAGON 11.4.6 Home Surround Sound System. Apart from incorporating 21 channels into a soundbar form factor, the system incorporates several other innovations: the first soundbar with 4 subwoofers, AMT tweeters, dual-angled front height channels, rotable rear height up-firing speakers and a pair of bi-polar surround speakers.

According to What Hi-Fi, the system is also the first plug-and-play soundbar set-up to use the Atmos code designed for AV receivers that support channels numbers greater than 7.1.4.

Formally demonstrated to major publications during the 2023 Consumer Electronics Show in Las Vegas, the system clinched the following awards and mentions.

- CES 2023 Innovation Awards: 2023 Honoree
- Digital Trends Top Tech of CES 2023 Awards
- Sound & Vision CES 2023 Editor’s Pick
- WhatHifi Stars of CES 2023 Award
- TechRadar: Best Dolby Atmos Soundbars of CES 2023
- TechHive: Best of CES 2023

Later in the year, Digital Trends reviewed and awarded the system its ‘Editor’s Choice’ badge, remarking that with its feature set, “The Nakamichi Dragon is just light-years ahead of any soundbar-based system”.

In 2024, Nakamichi unveiled a 12” subwoofer for the Nakamichi DRAGON, Weighing 36kg, each subwoofer utilizes a 12” carbon fiber-reinforced aluminium driver, paired to a carbon passive radiator.

With this launch, each Nakamichi DRAGON home surround sound system can be configured with up to four of these 12” subwoofers. Existing owners could also expand their systems with these subwoofers.

In 2025, Nakamichi unveiled the Shockwafe Wireless 11.2.6, a soundbar surround system which utilizes 31 Danish-engineered Punktkilde speaker drivers, two 10” subwoofers, and 5-way bipolar speakers. It also features AHD Ultra, a proprietary technology that intensifies height effects and has been made available to Nakamichi DRAGON surround system owners through a firmware upgrade. Unlike earlier iterations of the Shockwafe series, the surround speakers are wireless and do not need to be connected to the subwoofers with an RCA cable.

Notable press, including WhatHiFi attended their listening event in CES 2025, and described the system as one that delivers a powerful, forthright sound with spatial effects that seemed precise and engaging, at a slightly cheaper price tag than the DRAGON home surround sound system.

== Niro Nakamichi ==
In 2001, Niro Nakamichi, designer of many of the historic tape decks, started a new company, Mechanical Research Corporation, which introduced ultra-high end audio amplifiers, preamplifiers, and an integrated amplifier, called "engines." The products featured innovative designs and addressed issues of mechanical isolation, as well as presenting a unique appearance. Soon thereafter, however, the "engine" products were no longer promoted, and a line of home theater products was introduced.

== See also ==
- Nakamichi High Com II Noise Reduction System
- List of phonograph manufacturers
