= International Semi-Tech Microsystems =

Canadian household and consumer products firm

- Founded: 1981
- Founder: James Ting
- Defunct: 2000
- Fate: Bankruptcy
- Headquarters: Markham, Ontario

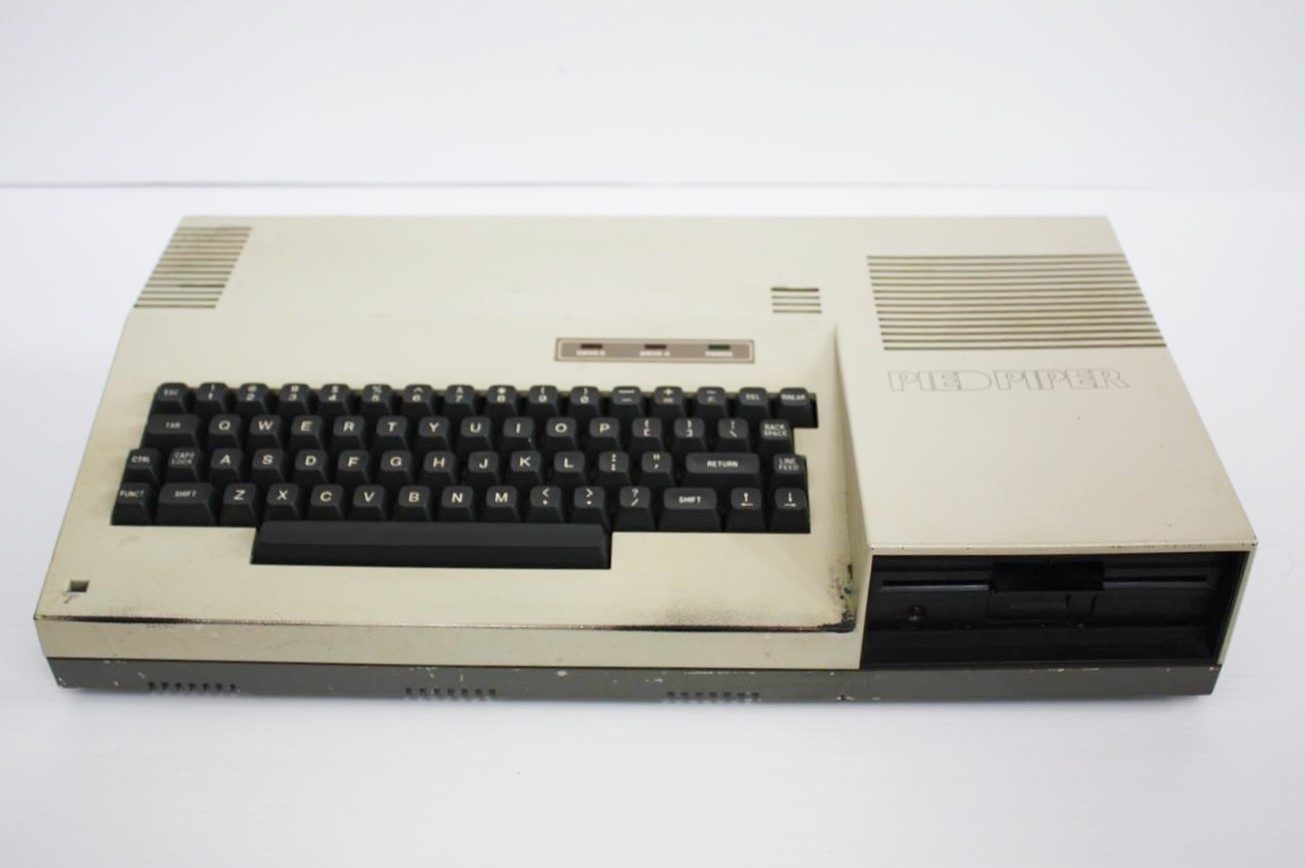
Pied Piper Communicator 1 home computer marketed by Semi-Tech in 1983

International Semi-Tech Microsystems or Semi-Tech Microsystems (STM) was a Canadian-based household and consumer products firm in Markham, Ontario. Semi-Tech Corporation's former head offices were at 131 McNabb Street (Warden Avenue and 14th Avenue) and near Woodbine Avenue and 14th Avenue (2880 14th Avenue).

Founded by Chinese-born Hong Kong-Canadian businessman James Ting in 1981, the firm had manufacturing facilities in China. Macau gambling tycoon Stanley Ho was once the firm's Chairman. The firm once traded on the Toronto Stock Exchange (SEM.A and SEM.B). It was renamed Semi-Tech Corporation in 1994 as it diversified into consumer products.

The company had bad bonds and millions of dollars of Canadian shareholders were burned. By late 1999, the company had just $600,000 in cash and unpaid debts of $650 million. It filed for bankruptcy in 2000. Ting was convicted of false accounting on Semi-Tech and its successor Akai Holdings and his other business Singer Corporation.

== See also ==
- ATI Technologies
- Grande Holdings
