= Wei Ding =

Computer scientist

Wei Ding is a computer scientist who is currently professor of computer science at the University of Massachusetts Boston. Her research involves data mining, machine learning, feature selection, and their applications in scientific computing and forensics.

== Education and career ==
Ding graduated in 1993 from Xi'an Jiaotong University with a bachelor's degree in computer science and applications. She worked in industry in China for five years before coming to the US as a master's student in software engineering at George Mason University. Completing her master's degree in 2000, she worked as a software engineer for Verisign in Virginia before becoming a lecturer in 2002 at the University of Houston–Clear Lake (UHCL), at the same time becoming a doctoral student at the University of Houston (a separate university from UHCL). She completed her Ph.D. in 2008.

She became an assistant professor at the University of Massachusetts Boston in 2008, and was promoted to associate and full professor in 2014 and 2019 respectively. Since 2019 she has been on leave from UMass Boston as a program director at the National Science Foundation, in the Information and Intelligent Systems division.

== Recognition ==
Ding was elected as an IEEE Fellow, in the 2023 class of fellows, "for contributions to data mining and big data research in scientific domains".
