= James Ting =

- Born: 1951 (age 74–75); Shanghai
- Citizenship: Chinese-Canadian
- Education: University of Toronto
- Occupation: Businessman
- Title: Founder of International Semi Tech Microsystems
- Criminal charges: False accounting

James Henry Ting Wei (丁謂, born 1951) is a Shanghai-born Chinese-Canadian former business executive who was once one of Hong Kong's most successful businessmen before being charged with illegal business practices.

== Early years ==
Ting was born in Shanghai in 1951 and moved to Hong Kong in 1958, where he studied at Rosaryhill School from 1963. Ting moved to Australia and moved to Canada with his wife to study engineering at the University of Toronto. After graduation, Ting founded International Semi Tech Microsystems, a computer assembler, in Toronto in 1981.

== Building the empire ==
With Semi-Tech Ting expanded beyond computer components to acquire various high-profile businesses like Singer Corporation, Sansui Electric, G.M. Pfaff and Akai. At its peak in 1997, Ting's business empire employed 100,000 people in 120 countries with sales of $5 billion. Before the empire collapsed in 1999, Ting sold them to Grande Holdings, which he founded in 1987.

== Collapse and downfall ==
These businesses Ting was involved in and improper business practices brought down his empire, tarnished the businesses he led or acquired. Singer made a loss of $238 million in 1997, while Semi-Tech and Akai both went bankrupt in 2000.

Ting fled Canada to avoid investigation by Canadian and US authorities and eventually Hong Kong to Macau. He was forced to return to Hong Kong, but left for China to avoid being investigated by Hong Kong regulators from 2000 to 2003. He was arrested after flying back from Macau by helicopter in March 2003 and was then investigated by Hong Kong Police's Commercial Crimes Bureau. On 29 June 2005 he was convicted to two counts of false accounting relating to a fake HK$300 million stake in MicroMain Systems, and was sentenced to six years in prison. After serving only one year, Ting's conviction was overturned by Hong Kong's Court of Appeals: he escaped retrial in 2006. He escaped another retrial in November 2007.

Ting's whereabouts after his legal problems are unknown.
