= Etsuro Nakamichi =

Japanese engineer and businessman

Etsurō Nakamichi (中道悦郎, Nakamichi Etsurō; died November 10, 1982) was a Japanese engineer and founder of Nakamichi Corporation, a high-end audio electronics company based in Tokyo in Japan. The company is most famous for its very high quality sounding cassette decks.

== Nakamichi's life ==
Etsuro Nakamichi founded Nakamichi Research in 1948. The brother of Niro Nakamichi, he was an acoustic engineering officer in the Imperial Japanese Navy doing sonar research. After the war, he started Nakamichi Research by researching in electromagnetism, magnetic recording, acoustics and communications.

The company he founded initially designed and developed portable radios, tone arms, speakers and communications equipment. With the development of magnetic tape in 1951, Nakamichi felt his company could develop and refine the technology of recording heads. Within a few years his company developed an open-reel tape recorder, and in 1957 the Japanese public was introduced to an open reel recorder under the FIDELA brand name.

The company he founded subsequently went on to develop some of the world's best cassette decks, including the world's first 3-head cassette deck. At one point in the mid 1960s the company manufactured tape decks for a number of foreign companies including Ampex, Harman Kardon and Motorola. His company was also the first to license Dolby-B Noise Reduction from Dolby Laboratories in 1969 as well as High-Com II from Telefunken in 1977.

== Etsuro Nakamichi Foundation ==
Shortly after Etsuro's passing, a foundation was made in his name. The Foundation was dedicated to the promotion and encouragement of baroque and other fine forms of classical music, in accordance with Etsuro's will.

== Takeshi Nakamichi ==
Etsuro's only son Takeshi Nakamichi (中道武, Nakamichi Takeshi) joined Nakamichi Corporation in April 1972. Takeshi is currently the President / Representative Director of Nakamichi Corporation.

== Niro Nakamichi ==
After Etsuro Nakamichi founded Nakamichi, his brother Niro joined and the two brothers worked to develop the company. In 2001, Nirō Nakamichi (中道仁郎, Nakamichi Nirō), designer of many of the historic tape decks, started a new company, Mechanical Research Corporation, which introduced ultra high end audio amplifiers, preamplifiers, and an integrated amplifier, called "engines". The products featured innovative designs and addressed issues of mechanical isolation, as well as presenting a unique appearance. Soon thereafter, however, the "engine" products were no longer promoted and a line of home theater products was introduced. The company was renamed Niro Corporation.
