= Pass Labs =

American audio equipment manufacturer

- Company type: Private
- Industry: Audio equipment
- Founded: 1991
- Founder: Nelson Pass
- Headquarters: Auburn, California, United States
- Products: Power amplifiers, preamplifiers, headphone amplifiers, loudspeakers
- Website: www.passlabs.com

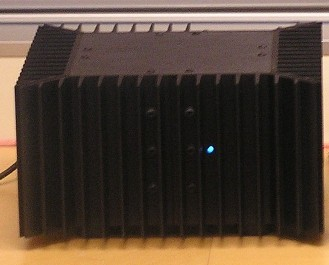
Aleph 3 Amplifier

Pass Labs (formally Pass Laboratories, Inc.) is an American manufacturer of high-end audio equipment based in Auburn, California. The company was founded in 1991 by audio designer Nelson Pass and produces solid-state power amplifiers, preamplifiers, headphone amplifiers and related components aimed at the audiophile market.

== History ==
Nelson Pass founded Pass Labs in 1991 in northern California, initially operating from his home workshop.

The first commercial product, the Aleph 0 monoblock, was introduced in the early 1990s, followed by additional Aleph models and matching preamplifier and phono stages.

By the late 1990s Pass Labs had introduced the X series of amplifiers marketed under the name "SuperSymmetry". In the 2000s the company launched the XA and later XS series of Class A amplifiers and expanded its range of preamplifiers and integrated amplifiers.

== Products ==
=== Aleph series ===
The Pass labs Aleph series of amplifiers operated pure class A and contained internal circuitry using MOSFETs. The Aleph amplifiers had a unique appearance, a cube with heat sinks on all four sides, a practical solution to the heat generated by the class-A design.

After the Aleph series of amplifiers was discontinued, a separate entity Volksamp was licensed to continue to produce a similar product. Aleph 30 and 60 Amplifiers were made by Volksamp until production ceased in 2003.

Manufacture of the Aleph series of amplifiers is to be continued by First Watt, an amplifier company founded by Nelson Pass in 2004. First Watt initially produced power trans-conductance amplifiers (or technically a power current source). These current domain amplifiers are only suitable for use with certain types of speakers. With respect to the Aleph amplifier line, First Watt has announced plans for the Aleph J, a revision of the famous Pass Labs Aleph 3/Volksamp Aleph 30 wherein a new JFET input stage is to be added.

=== X, XA and XS series ===
Current Pass Labs "X" series amplifiers use a distortion canceling balanced audio signal circuit..

=== Preamplifiers, headphone amplifiers and loudspeakers ===
Pass Labs manufactures line-level preamplifiers and phono stages under the XP and XS designations, which use solid-state circuitry and are positioned for use with the company's power amplifiers and other high-end systems.

In 2015, Pass Labs introduced the HPA-1, a Class A headphone amplifier that also functions as a compact line preamplifier. The HPA-1 uses a discrete MOSFET output stage and is designed to drive a wide range of headphone loads.
