= Akai =

Japanese electronics manufacturer

Akai Electric Company Ltd
- Type: Subsidiary
- Industry: Electronics
- Founded: 1929; 97 years ago, in Tokyo, Japan
- Founder: Masukichi Akai
- Defunct: 2000; 26 years ago
- Products: Hi-fi equipment
- Parent: Mitsubishi Electric (c. 1987–1994); International Semi-Tech Microsystems (c. 1994–1999); Grande Holdings (1999–present; brand name)

Akai (Japanese: 赤井, pronounced [a̠ka̠i]) was a Japanese electronics manufacturer, established as Akai Electric Company Ltd in Tokyo in 1929. It was best known outside Japan for its tape recorders during the 1960s and 1970s. The company became bankrupt in 2000 and since then third-party products have been marketed under the Akai brand name, which has since been owned by Grande Holdings of Hong Kong.

In its earlier history, Akai had made many innovations in the development of magnetic tape-based audio technology. Around 1980, the music division Akai Professional was founded, offering production and stage equipment for modern music. After the controversial collapse of the business in 2000, the Akai brand came under the ownership of Hong Kong based Grande Holdings. The company now distributes a range of electronic products, including LED TVs, washing machines, clothes dryers, air conditioners, and smartphones. These products are developed through collaborations with other electronics companies with relevant expertise.

The Akai Professional electronic instrument division had already been spun off as a separate business in 1999 and today operates under the unrelated ownership of inMusic Brands.

== Corporate history ==
Akai was founded by Masukichi Akai and his son, Saburo Akai (who died in 1973), as Akai Electric Company Ltd. (赤井電機株式会社, Akai Denki Kabushiki Gaisha), a Japanese manufacturer, in 1929. Some sources, however, suggest the company was established in 1946. (Note: Although reliable sources are not yet found, according to several sources (kotobank.jp, ja:Akai Professional), Masukichi Akai established Akai Press Industry in 1923, and his son, Saburo Akai, founded Akai Electric Company Ltd. in 1946, with Masukichi serving as the president of both.)

The company's business eventually became disorganized, and it exited the audio industry in 1991. At its peak in the late 1990s, Akai Holdings employed 100,000 workers and had annual sales of HK$40 billion (US$5.2 billion). The company filed for insolvency in November 2000, owing creditors US$1.1 billion. It emerged that ownership of Akai Holdings had passed to Grande Holdings in 1999, a company founded by Akai's chairman James Ting. The liquidators claimed that Ting had stolen over US$800 million from the company with the assistance of accountants Ernst & Young, who had tampered with audit documents dating back to 1994. Ting was imprisoned for false accounting in 2005, and E&Y paid $200 million to settle the negligence case out of court in September 2009. In a separate lawsuit, a former E&Y partner, Christopher Ho, made a "substantial payment" to Akai creditors in his role as chairman of Grande Holdings.

The "Akai Professional" division, specializing in electronic instruments, became a separate business in 1999. It was acquired in 2005 by businessman Jack O'Donnell (later becoming a part of his inMusic Brands group) and is no longer associated with the main "Akai" brand.

== History ==
=== Historical products ===
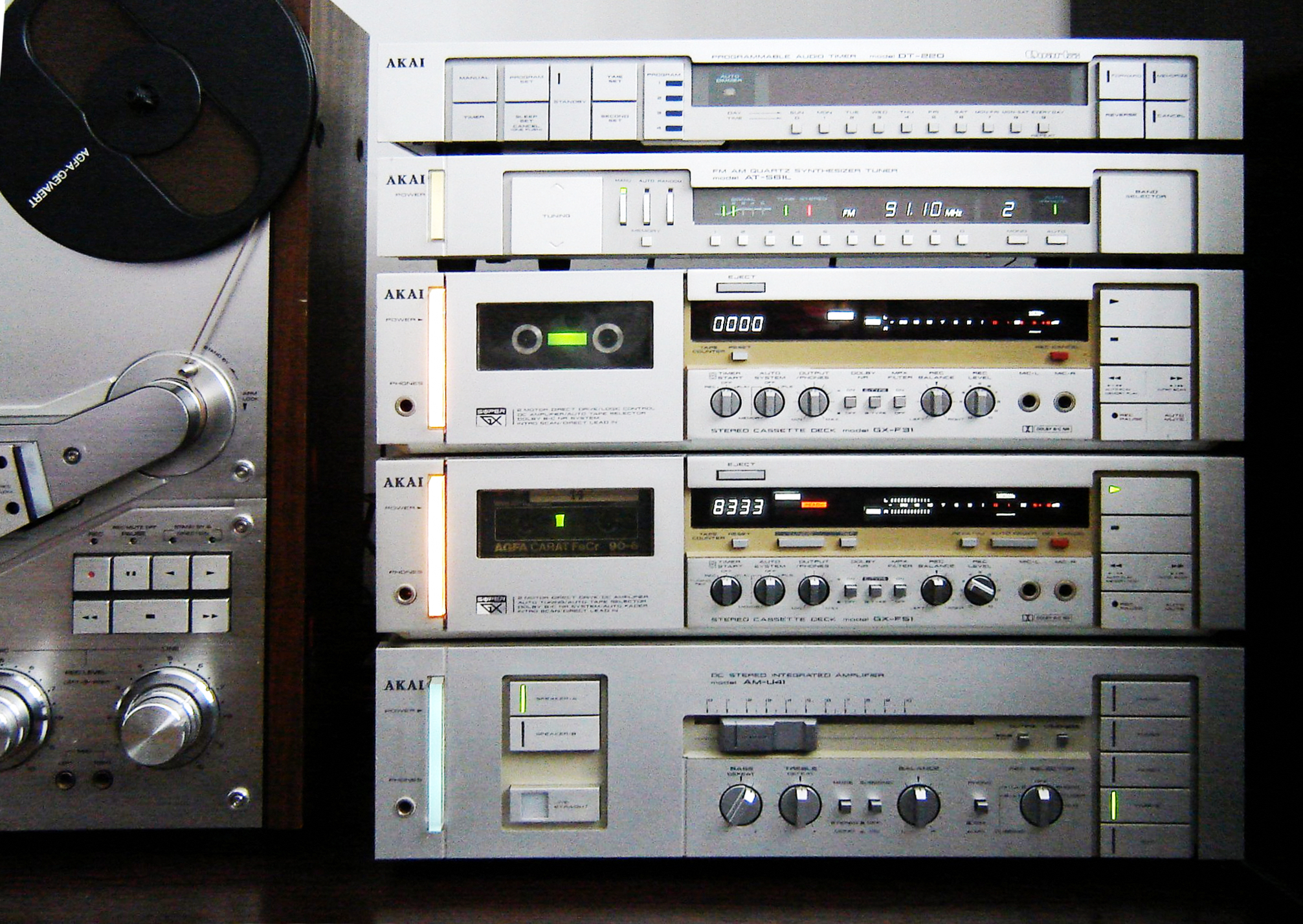
Stack of historical AKAI machines

Akai's products included reel-to-reel audiotape recorders (such as the GX series), tuners (top-level AT, mid-level TR and TT series), audio cassette decks (top-level GX and TFL, mid-level TC, HX, and CS series), amplifiers (AM and TA series), microphones, receivers, turntables, video recorders, and loudspeakers.

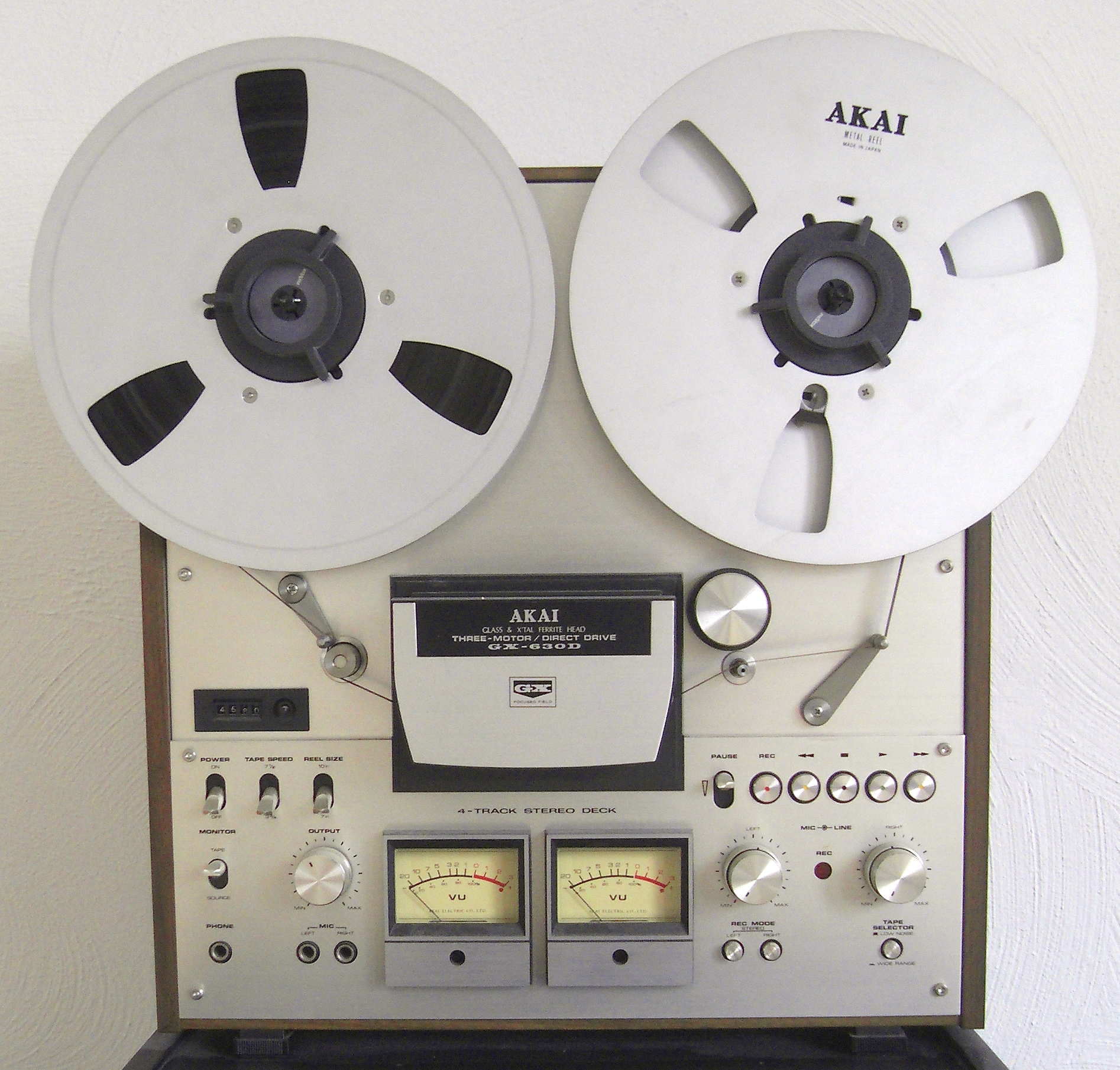
Tape recorder GX-630D

Many Akai products were sold under the name Roberts in the U.S., as well as A&D in Japan (from 1987, following a partnership with Mitsubishi Electric), Tensai, and Transonic Strato in Western Europe. During the late 1960s, Akai adopted Tandberg's cross-field recording technologies (using an extra tape head) to enhance high-frequency recording and later switched to the increasingly reliable Glass and Crystal (X'tal) (GX) ferrite heads. The company's most popular products included the GX-630D, GX-635D, GX-747/GX-747DBX, and GX-77 open-reel recorders (the latter featuring an auto-loading function), the three-head, closed-loop GX-F95, GX-90, GX-F91, GX-R99 cassette decks, and the AM-U61, AM-U7, and AM-93 stereo amplifiers.

Akai manufactured and badged most of its imported hi-fi products under the Tensai brand (named after the Swiss audio and electronics distributor Tensai International). Tensai International served as Akai's exclusive distributor for the Swiss and Western European markets until 1988.

Akai limited its consumer hi-fi product line in the United States and Europe toward the end of the 20th century.

==== Innovative VCR features ====
Akai produced consumer video cassette recorders (VCRs) during the mid-1980s. The Akai VS-2 was the first VCR to feature an on-screen display, originally named the Interactive Monitor System. By displaying information directly on the television screen, this innovation eliminated the need for the user to be physically near the VCR to program recordings, read the tape counter, or perform other common functions. Within a few years, all competing manufacturers had adopted on-screen display technology in their own products. Their late 1980s/early 1990s VCRs heralded the first VHS quick start mechanism, the first VCR with on-board Dolby Surround decoder, circuitry that optimized picture quality depending on the quality of the videotape ("I-HQ") and – for their European models – on-board Teletext decoders for easier timer programming. Again, competing manufacturers followed suit and offered similar features in their decks.

=== Akai Professional ===
In 1984, a new division of the company was formed to focus on the manufacture and sale of electronic instruments, and was called Akai Professional.

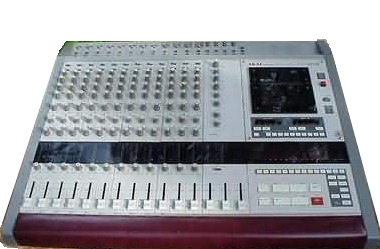
Akai's portable studio, Akai MG-1214 unit

The first product released by the new subsidiary was the MG1212, a 12-channel, 12-track recorder. This innovative device used a specialized VHS-like cartridge (the MK-20) and could record 10 minutes of continuous 12-track audio at 19 cm per second or 20 minutes at half speed (9.5 cm per second). One track (14) was permanently dedicated to recording absolute time, and another for synchronization such as SMPTE or MTC. Each channel strip included dbx type-1 noise reduction and semi-parametric equalizers (with fixed bandwidths). The unit also featured innovations like an electronic 2-bus system, a 12-stereo channel patch bay, and automatic punch in and out capabilities, among others. The unique transport design and noise reduction gave these units a recording quality that rivaled more expensive 16-track machines using 1" tape. The MG-1212 was later succeeded by the MG-1214, which improved the transport mechanism and overall performance.

==== AX series analog synthesizers ====
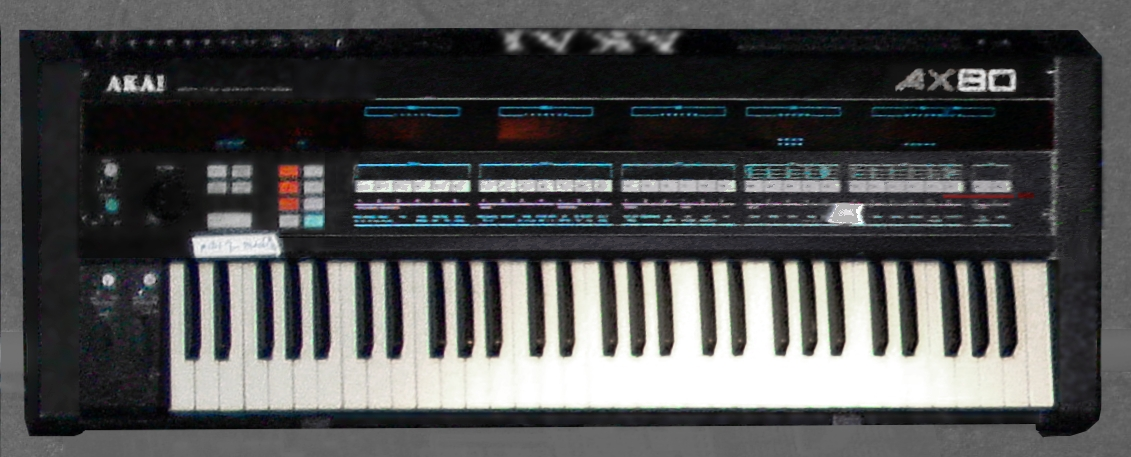
AX80

Other early products included the Akai AX80 8-voice analog synthesizer in 1984, followed by the AX60 and AX73 6-voice analog synthesizers around 1986. The AX-60 borrowed many design elements from the Roland Juno series, but used voltage-controlled analog oscillators (VCO) as its sound source, unlike Roland's more common digitally controlled analog oscillators (DCO). It also allowed the performer to "split" the keyboard, assigning different timbres to different ranges of keys. The AX-60 featured the ability to interface with Akai's early samplers via a serial cable, using 12-bit samples as an additional oscillator.

==== Digital Samplers (S, X, Z series) ====
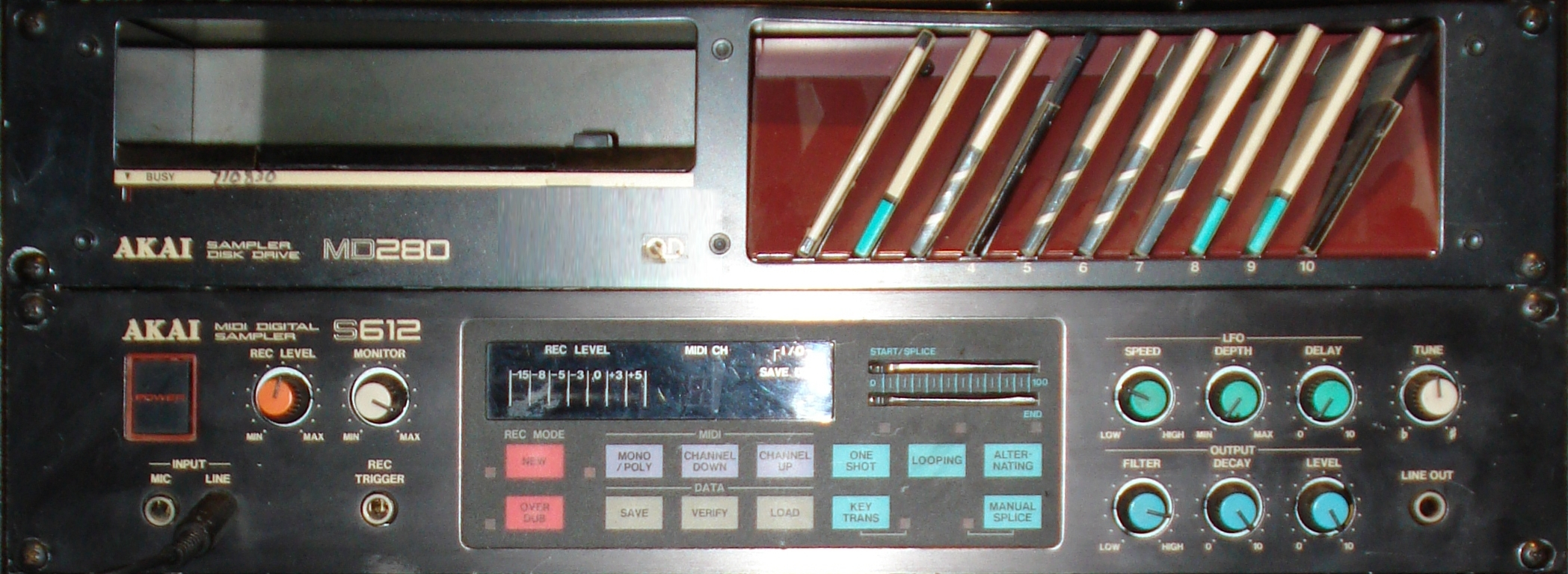
S612

The S612 12-bit digital sampler released in 1985 was the first in a series of relatively affordable samplers, designed in a 19-inch studio-rack format and finished in black. It could hold only a single sample at a time, which was loaded into memory via a separate disk drive utilizing 2.8-inch Quick Disk floppy disks. The maximum sample time at the highest quality sampling rate (32 kHz) was one second.

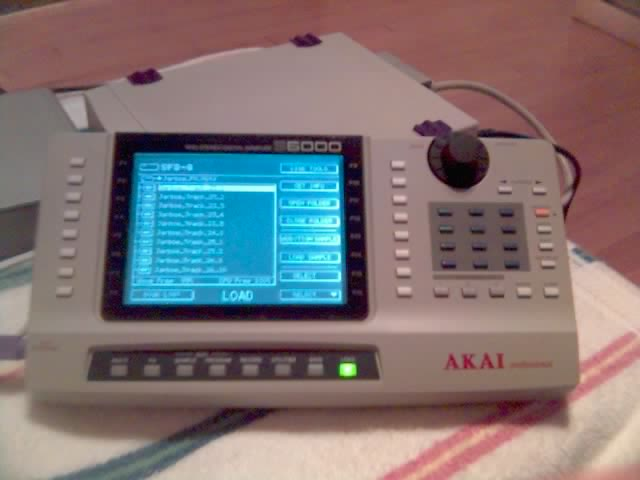
S6000 remote

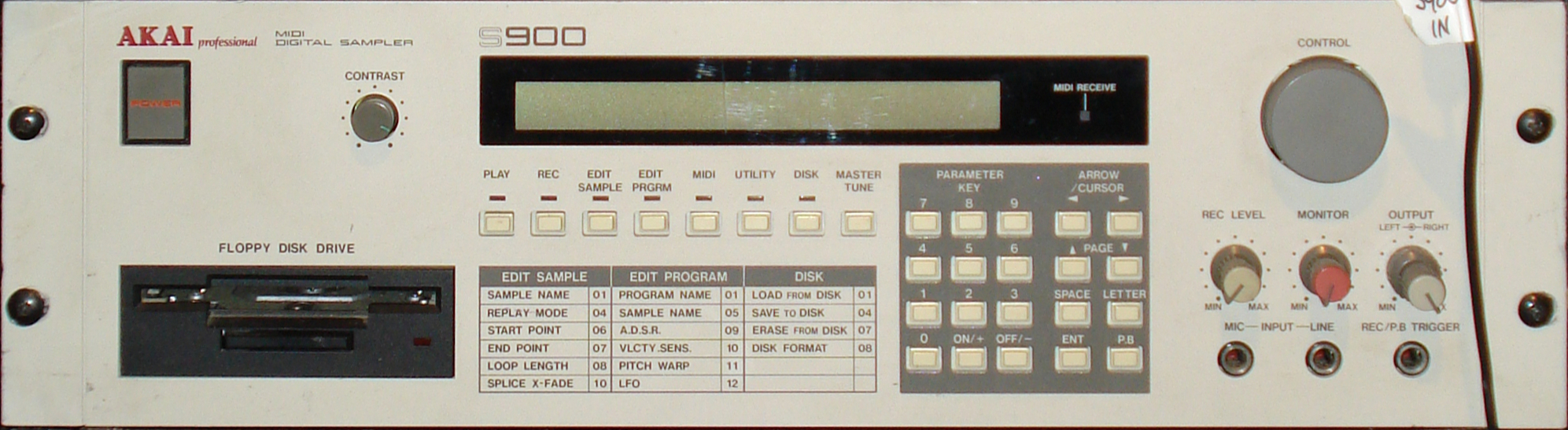
S900

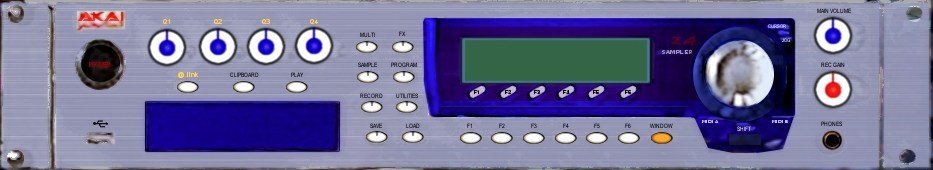
Z4

The introduction of a "professional" range of digital samplers began with the 12-bit S900 in 1986, followed by the X7000 keyboard sampler in 1986, and the S700 rack-mount version in 1987. Unlike the single-sample S612, these models allowed the use of up to six active samples simultaneously, featured a built-in disk drive, and could be extended with six individual outputs via cable. Additionally, a flash memory extension added another six samples to the memory for multisample playback. The S700/X7000 sampler series were light grey in color, a design choice that remained consistent throughout the entire "professional" range of Akai samplers.

The 16-bit Akai S1000 series followed in 1988, introducing the ability to read CD-ROMs and write to hard disks via SCSI. This range was eventually superseded by the S3000 series in 1993, which offered an optional built-in CD-ROM drive, followed by the S5000 and S6000 models. Additional notable releases included the Z4 and Z8 24-bit 96 kHz samplers.

==== MPC ====
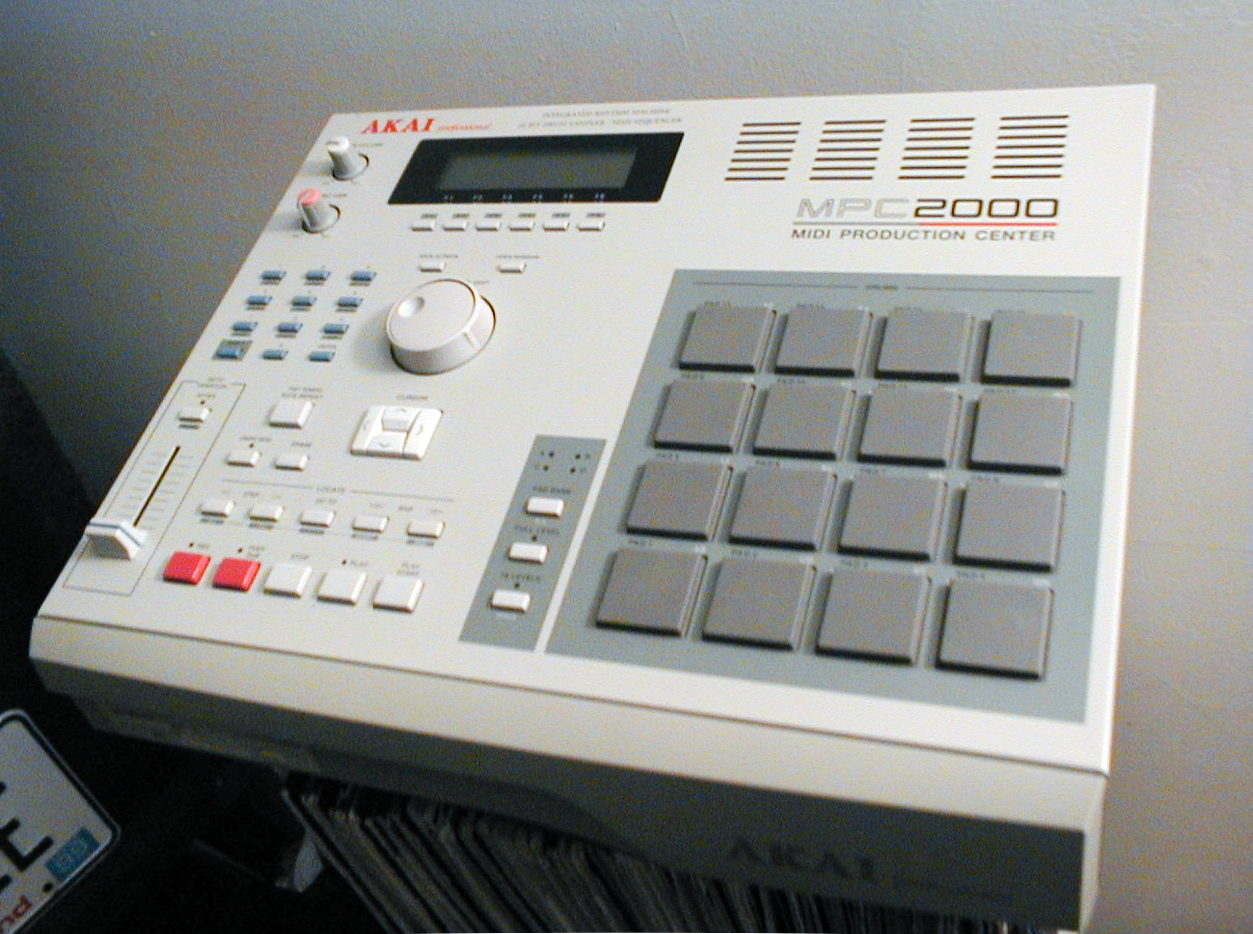
MPC2000

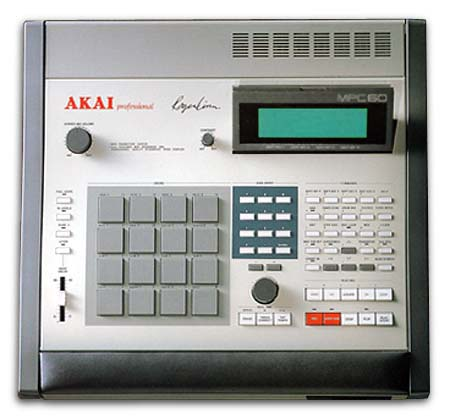
MPC60

Akai also produced several Digital MIDI sequencers and digital synthesizers such as the MPC range, a line of integrated drum machines, MIDI sequencers, samplers and direct-to-disk recorders.

==== New ownership of Akai Professional ====
In December 1999, one year before the application of the Civil Rehabilitation Act to Akai Electric Company Ltd., the brand of its musical instrument division, Akai Professional, was acquired by a company based in the United States. The new company was named "Akai Professional Musical Instrument Corporation". Akai Professional M.I. was established the same year, but it filed for bankruptcy in 2005.

In 2004, following a US distribution deal, the Akai Professional Musical Instrument division was acquired by Jack O'Donnell, owner of Numark Industries and Alesis. In 2012, inMusic Brands was formed as the parent company for O'Donnell's companies, including Akai Professional.

== Current Akai products ==
In early 2003, Grande Holdings began reintroducing Akai's brands by marketing various audio-visual products manufactured by Samsung. In the same year, Grande started distributing Akai home appliances, including air conditioners, vacuum cleaners, and refrigerators. In the 2010s, it began distributing Akai smartphones in collaboration with Chinese smartphone manufacturers such as Gionee, in India and other countries.

=== Video ===
- AV receivers
- Portable DVD players
- DVD players
- DVD recorders
- Home theatre systems
- Home theatre speakers
- VCD players
- VCRs

=== Mobile sound ===
- Amplifiers
- Cassette receivers
- CD changers
- CD receivers
- DVD changers
- DVD receivers
- Car audio – DVD players
- Car audio – speakers
- Car audio – TFT monitors

=== Home appliances ===
- Air conditioners
- Air coolers
- Air purifiers
- Chest freezers
- Dishwashers
- Heaters
- Ice makers
- Microwave ovens
- Refrigerators
- Showcases
- Vacuum cleaners
- Wall Ovens
- Washing machines
- Water dispensers
- Wine cellars

=== Audio ===
- Stereo rack systems
- Mini systems
- Micro music
- Retro radios
- Sound boxes
- Portable music players
- Tape decks
- Portable DAT recorder/player (Blue colored body, Webshop DirectOrder only, OEM from JVC/Victor)
- Portable MD recorder/player (Blue color body, Webshop DirectOrder only, OEM from JVC/Victor)

=== Digital ===
- Wireless surround sound systems
- Bluetooth
- MP3 player
- Mobile phones
- Smart phones

=== Television ===
- CRT color television sets
- LCD televisions
- Plasma television
- Set-top boxes

== Akai Professional products ==
Logo of Akai Professional

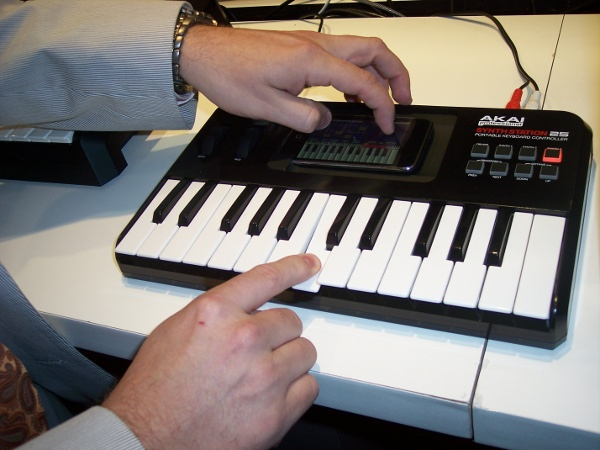
Akai Synthstation 25

=== Synthesizers ===
- AX60 (1986) – discontinued
- AX73 (1986) – discontinued
- AX80 (1984) – discontinued
- VX90 (1986) – rack-mount version of AX73, discontinued
- VX600 (1988) – 3-octave keyboard synthesizer with EWI connection jack, discontinued
- Akai SG01v (1995) – desktop sound module, discontinued
- MINIAK – discontinued

=== Samplers ===
- S612 (1985) – discontinued
- S900 (1986) – discontinued
- X3700 (1986) – discontinued
- X7000 (1986) – discontinued
- S700 (1987) – discontinued
- S950 (1988) – discontinued
- S1000 (1988) – discontinued
- S1100 (1990) – discontinued
- S01 (1992) – discontinued
- S2800 (1992) – discontinued
- S3000 (1993) – discontinued
- S3200 (1993) – discontinued
- CD3000 (1993) – discontinued
- REMIX16 (1995) – table-top phrase sampler, discontinued
- S2000 (1995) – discontinued
- S3000XL (1995) – discontinued
- S3200XL (1995) – discontinued
- S20 (c.1997) – discontinued
- CD3000XL (c.1996/1997) – discontinued
- S5000 (1999) – discontinued
- S6000 (1999) – discontinued
- Z4 (2002) – discontinued
- Z8 (2002) – discontinued
- MPX8
- MPX16

=== Music Production Center ===
- MPC60 (1987) – MIDI Production Centre, discontinued
- MPC60II – (1991) – discontinued
- MPC3000 (1993) – discontinued
- MPC3000LE (1999) – discontinued
- MPC2000 (1997) – discontinued
- MPC2000XL (1999) – discontinued
- MPC4000 (2002) – discontinued
- MPC1000 (2003) – discontinued
- MPC500 (2006) – discontinued
- MPC2500 (2005) – discontinued
- MPC5000 (2008) – discontinued
- MPC Renaissance (2012) – discontinued
- MPC Studio (2012) – Discontinued
- MPC Element (2013) – Discontinued
- MPC Touch (2015)
- MPC Studio Black (2016)
- MPC Live (2017)
- MPC X (2017)
- MPC Force (2019)
- MPC One (2020)
- MPC Live ll (2020)
- MPC Studio II (2021)
- MPC Key 61 (2022)
- MPC One+ (2023)
- MPC Live III (2025)
- MPC XL (2026)
- MPC Sample (2026)

=== Computer audio interfaces ===
- EIE (2011)
- EIE PRO (2011)

=== Drum machines ===
- MR16 (1985)
- XE-8 1U rack mounted, Acoustic drum sound from S-1000 library, discontinued
- XR10, discontinued Table Top Playback Sampler incl XE-8 Sound with Dance Sample Sounds 16-bit, discontinued
- XR20 (2008) Made by Alesis
- Rhythm Wolf (2015) Tabletop analogue drum machine with bass synth
- Tom Cat

=== Electronic wind instruments ===
- EVI1000 (1987) – Electronic Valve Instruments, discontinued
- EWI1000 (1987) – Electronic Wind Instrument, discontinued
- EWV2000 – Electronic Wind Instrument sound module, discontinued
- EWI4000S (2005)
- EWI-USB (2008)
- EWI5000 (2014)
- EWI SOLO (2020)

=== Effects units / Utilities ===
- EX90R – Reverb, discontinued
- ME10D – MIDI digital delay, discontinued
- ME15F – MIDI dynamic controller, discontinued
- ME20A – MIDI sequencer arpeggiator, discontinued
- ME25S – MIDI note separator, discontinued
- ME30P – MIDI 4×8 patchbay, discontinued
- ME35T – Audio/MIDI trigger, discontinued
- ME80P – MIDI 8×10 patchbay, discontinued
- MB76 – Programmable mix bay, discontinued
- PEQ6 – Programmable equaliser, discontinued
- DP88 (1993) – digital audio patchbay, discontinued
- AR900 (1986–89) – 16-bit MIDI Digital Reverb, discontinued
- MFC42 (2001) – filter bank, discontinued
- HV10 Harmony generator (2002)
- VST Plug-ins (2002)

=== Guitar pedals ===
- Analog Delay
- Blues Overdrive
- Chorus
- Compressor
- Deep Impact Synth
- Deluxe Distortion
- Drive3 Distortion
- Drive3 Fuzz
- Drive3 Overdrive
- E2 Head Rush
- Flanger
- Phase Shifter
- Akai Shred-o-Matic D1tube driven distortion pedal

=== iPod/iPad Keyboard Controllers ===
- SynthStation25
- SynthStation49
- AkaiMPC Fly (2012)

=== MIDI Sequencers ===
- MS08 (c.1985) – discontinued
- ASQ10 (c.1986/7) – discontinued

=== Standalone Multi-track Audio Recorders ===
- MG614 (1983?) – discontinued
- MG1212 (1984) – discontinued
- MG1214 (1985) – discontinued
- DR1200/DL1200 (1988) – discontinued
- DD1000 (1990) – discontinued
- DD/DL1500 (1994) – 16-track DAW, discontinued
- DD8 (1996) – discontinued
- DD8plus (1998) – discontinued
- DR4D (1993) – discontinued
- DR8 (1994) – discontinued
- DR16 (1995) – discontinued
- DPS12 (1997) – discontinued
- DPS16 (1999) – discontinued
- DPS24 (2002) – discontinued
- DPS24MKII – discontinued
- RE32 (1999) – controller for DD/DR series, discontinued

=== Studio Monitor Speakers ===
- RPM3
- RPM8 – discontinued
- 50x

=== MIDI Controllers ===
- APC20
- APC40
- APC40 MkII
- EWI-USB
- LPD8 (2009)
- LPK25 (2009)
- MPD16 (2002) – discontinued
- MPD18 – discontinued
- MPD24 (2006) – discontinued
- MPD26 (2010)
- MPD32 (2008)
- MPK25 (2009)
- MPK49 (2007)
- MPK49 V2 (2007)
- MPK61 (2009)
- MPK88 (2009)
- MPK Mini
- MPK Mini Play
- MPK Mini MK II (2014)
- MPK Mini MK III (2020)
- MPK225 (2014)
- MPK249 (2014)
- MPK261 (2014)
- MAX25 (2014)
- MAX49 (2014)
- MX73 MIDI Master Keyboard – discontinued
- MX76 MIDI Master Keyboard (1987) – discontinued

== See also ==
- 1/4-inch Akai VTRs
- Akai VK (videocassette format) VTRs
- List of phonograph manufacturers
