= Keyboard (magazine) =

Audio technology magazine

- Editor-in-Chief: Gino Robair
- Categories: Music
- Frequency: Monthly (until 2017), Daily (Online since 2017)
- Publisher: Joe Perry
- Founded: 1975
- Final issue: 2017 (print)
- Company: Future US
- Country: USA
- Based in: San Bruno, California
- Language: English
- Website: musicradar.com/keyboardmag
- ISSN: 0730-0158

Keyboard is a magazine that originally covered electronic keyboard instruments and keyboardists, though with the advent of computer-based recording and audio technology, they have added digital music technology to their regular coverage, including those not strictly pertaining to the keyboard-related instruments. The magazine has its headquarters in San Bruno, California.

== History and profile ==
Future is the owner of Keyboard which was launched in 1975. During the initial years the magazine was named Contemporary Keyboard. Over the years, the print and online editions of the magazine have moved into discussions on anything related to gear. The editors and writers of the magazine have covered historical information and stories on the development of keyboards from their inception with pioneers such as Moog Music. At times, editorial and guest articles in the magazine have covered subjects including music philosophy, keyboarding instruction, music theory, and harmonics.

It is not uncommon to find advertisements and endorsements for high-tech audio gear and computer hardware and software within the pages of the two editions.

Stephen Fortner served as the editor-in-chief of the magazine between 2009 and September 2015. Gino Robair was then made editor.

In early 2017, the magazine transitioned from a standalone print publication to an online one. Jon Regen was made editor of Keyboardmag.com in March 2017.

It is now operated under the MusicRadar brand at musicradar.com/keyboardmag.
