= Stingray Advertising =

Provider of in-store radio and television networks

- Formerly: Pop Radio (1983–1997); InStore Broadcasting Network (1997–2014); InStore Audio Network (2014–2022)
- Type: Subsidiary
- Industry: Retail Media
- Founded: 1983
- Headquarters: 13 Roszel Road, Princeton, New Jersey
- Products: Distribution of music & video
- Number of employees: 65
- Parent: Stingray Group
- Website: Stingray Advertising

Stingray Advertising is an American broadcasting company that provides in-store music, video content and audio advertising for use in supermarkets, drugstores, and other retail stores. It is owned by the Canadian media company Stingray Group and based in Princeton, New Jersey.

The company was founded in 1983 as Pop Radio and was renamed to InStore Broadcasting Network (IBN) before rebranding to InStore Audio Network (ISAN) Through multiple ownership changes over the years, ISAN was acquired by Stingray in 2022 and adopted its current name later that year.

== History ==
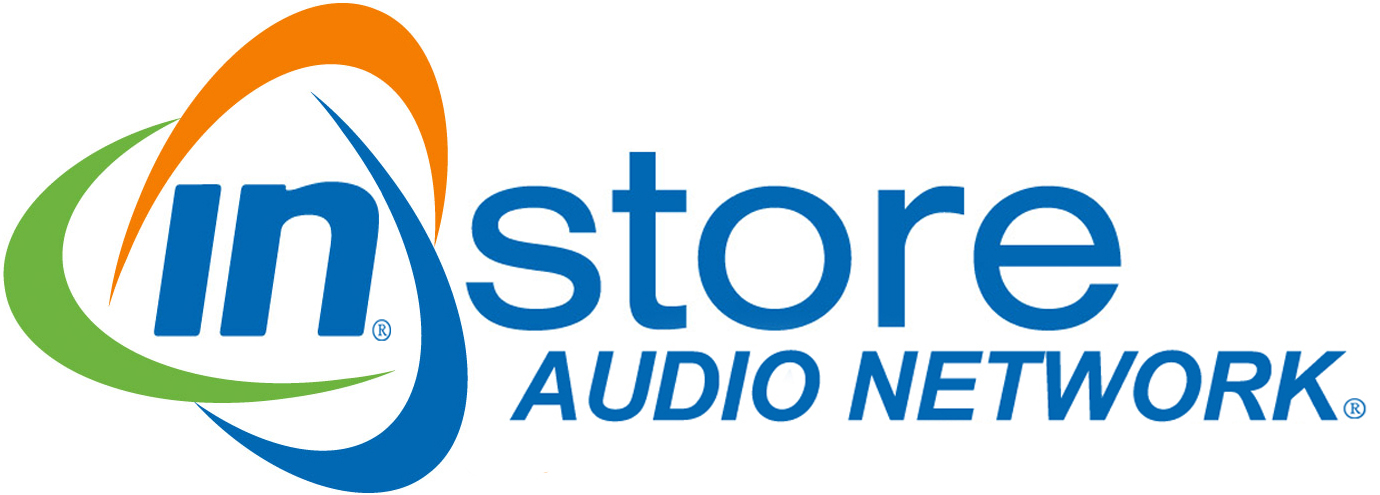
Former logo as In-Store Audio Network.

Founded in 1983 as POP Radio, ISAN was acquired by Heritage Media in 1990. The company was merged into Heritage subsidiary ActRadio, before Heritage was acquired by News America Marketing, a division of News Corporation, in 1997. Then known as the InStore Broadcasting Network, the company was spun off from News America Marketing in 2003, sold to Gary Seem and Jeff Shapiro. Its headquarters relocated from Salt Lake City to Princeton, New Jersey in 2014.

ISAN was acquired by Montreal-based Stingray Group in January 2022. The ISAN brand was phased out later that year, with the service rebranded as Stingray Advertising.

== System ==
InStore Audio Network's music programming is housed locally on a music server at each location, containing the music library, audio messages and ISAN's proprietary scheduling and delivery software. This software enables each server to receive new audio ads and music playlists as often as necessary, transferred over the Internet. The playlists dictate what will be played during the following week in that particular store so that every retail store can be customized with its own music and/or audio messages.

== Clients ==
In 2012, ISAN said it provided advertiser-supported music programming to over 33,000 supermarkets, pharmacies, and other stores in the United States. Its typically works with retailers who are national or regional in nature. Included are stores owned by Ahold (including Giant Food Stores, Stop & Shop, Tops and Martin's), Albertsons (including Safeway and others), Kroger, Supervalu, Meijer, and Southeastern Grocers.

== Competitors ==
InStore Audio Network directly competes with the following companies:

- Mood Media, the parent company of Muzak, DMX Music, and PlayNetwork
- MTI Digital
