= Background music =

Music that deliberately establishes mood

Soundtrack of Pixel Dungeon, a 2012 video game.

Background music (British English: piped music) is a mode of musical performance in which the music is not intended to be a primary focus of potential listeners, but instead used to influence the atmosphere of an environment. Its content, character, and volume level are deliberately chosen to affect behavioral and emotional responses in humans such as concentration, relaxation, distraction, and excitement. Listeners are commonly exposed to background music in public, commercial, and occupational settings, often with limited control over its volume or content. Research shows that people respond to background music in many different ways, with responses varying widely based on where the music is heard, what people are doing, their cultural background, or even what time of day it is.

Background music is commonly played where there is no audience at all, such as empty hallways, restrooms and fitting rooms. It is also used in artificial space, such as music played while on hold during a telephone call, and virtual space, as in the ambient sounds or thematic music in video games. It is typically played at low volumes from multiple small speakers distributing the music across broad public spaces. Research has examined the effects of background music on attention and cognitive performance, suggesting that it can influence concentration during task-based activities, depending on music tempo, complexity, and the presence of lyrics. The widespread use of background music in offices, restaurants, and stores began with the founding of Muzak, or light background music, in the 1930s and was characterized by repetition and simple musical arrangements. More recent research on background music in workplace environments suggests that its use can influence employee satisfaction and perceived work performance, although the effects on productivity vary depending on task demands and individual preferences. Studies in retail environments suggest that background music can influence consumer mood, arousal, and the amount of time spent in stores, which may in turn affect purchasing behavior.

Due to the growing variety of settings (from doctors' offices to airports), many styles of music are utilized as background music. Because the aim of background music is passive listening, vocals, commercial interruptions, and complexity are typically avoided. In spite of the international distribution common to syndicated background music artists, it is often associated with artistic failure and a lack of musical talent in the entertainment industry. There are composers who write specifically for music syndication services such as Dynamic Media and Mood Media, successors of Muzak, and MTI Digital. Multiple studies have correlated the presence of background music with increased spending in retail establishments.

== Types ==
=== Incidental music ===
The use of incidental music dates back at least as far as Greek drama. A number of classical composers have written incidental music for various plays, with the more famous examples including Joseph Haydn's Il distratto music, Wolfgang Amadeus Mozart's Thamos, King of Egypt music, Ludwig van Beethoven's Egmont music, Franz Schubert's Rosamunde music, Felix Mendelssohn's A Midsummer Night's Dream music, Robert Schumann's Manfred music, Georges Bizet's L'Arlésienne music, and Edvard Grieg's Peer Gynt music. Parts of all of these are often performed in concerts outside the context of the play. Vocal incidental music, which is included in the classical scores mentioned above, should not be confused with the score of a Broadway or film musical, in which the songs often reveal character and further the storyline. Vocal incidental music sets the tone for a film through using various beats or sounds, portraying the emotions of certain scenes. Since the score of a Broadway or film musical is what actually makes the work a musical, it is far more essential to the work than mere incidental music, which nearly always amounts to little more than a background score; indeed, many plays have no incidental music whatsoever, allowing the actors to express their characters solely through words and their expressions.

=== Furniture music ===
The term furniture music was coined by Erik Satie in 1917, and demonstrated by him in three sets of compositions: Musique d'ameublement (1917), Sons industriels (1920) and Tenture de cabinet préfectoral (1923). It fell into disuse when the composer died a few years later, and the genre was revived several decades later. After his death, furniture music was reinterpreted and programmed in concerts; many individuals found that it filled the awkward pauses, allowing audiences to become better immersed into the performance. Typical of furniture music are short musical passages, with an indefinite number of repeats.

=== Muzak / Elevator music ===
Elevator music (also known as Muzak, piped music, or lift music) is a more general term indicating music that is played in rooms where many people come together (that is, not for the explicit purpose of listening to music), and during telephone calls when placed on hold. There is a specific sound associated with elevator music, but it usually involves simple instrumental themes from "soft" popular music, or "light" classical music being performed by slow strings. More recent types of elevator music may be computer-generated, with the actual score being composed entirely algorithmically.

The term can also be used for kinds of easy listening, piano solo, jazz or middle of the road music, or what are known as "beautiful music" radio stations.

=== Corporate music ===
Corporate music (or corporate production music) is a term for background music, made to work with company presentations: rather subtle, understated and unobtrusive. However, it should not be confused with "corporate pop" - pop music produced by corporations and that "blurs the line between independent and mainstream".

=== Video game music ===
Video game music (VGM) is a soundtrack for video games. Songs may be original and composed specifically for the game, or preexisting music licensed for use in the game. Music in video games can be heard over a game's title screen, menus and during gameplay.

=== Website music ===
The early social media website Myspace has supported a feature where specific songs chosen by the user would automatically play on their profile pages. Research on website design and user experience suggests that background audio along with other sensory elements, can influence user engagement, emotional responses, and the experience of "flow" while browsing, depending on how the website features are implemented.

=== Group fitness music ===
With the proliferation of boutique fitness classes in the late 2010s, a new emphasis is being placed on properly licensing music to be used by instructors in a group fitness environment. As it is more interactive than traditional background music, the licensing and cost structures differ.

=== Internet delivered background music ===
Internet-delivered background music was delivered by companies such as Mood Media (which had acquired Trusonic, which had acquired Muzak). Trusonic's internet-based MBOX system allowed retailers to distribute music and messaging updates to individual store locations over the Internet, replacing earlier distribution methods such as compact discs and satellite delivery. Using this technique enables the creator to include more meaning in their work and effectively convey their messages. Playing music that affects the mood of the audience evokes many emotions, making the work more memorable.

== Background non-music ==
=== Business audio ===
Business audio refers to music and other audio content licensed for use in public or commercial environments. This includes background music services—sometimes called elevator music—and business news programming designed to enhance the customer experience or inform staff and patrons.

Providers of business audio and background music services include:

- Muzak Holdings LLC
- DMX
- PlayNetwork
- MTI Digital
- XM for Business
- Music Choice
- Trusonic

In the United States, the terms "elevator music" and "Muzak" are commonly used to describe business audio services that deliver background music in retail or hospitality settings.

== History ==
Founded in 1934, Muzak was among the early background music providers.

Business audio is produced off-site and delivered to the client via a number of methods including DBS satellite, SDARS satellite, coaxial cable, FM radio subcarrier, leased line, internet broadband, compact disc, and tape.

Most audio content is licensed for personal and home use only. Business audio services allow clients to use audio content in public and commercial settings by paying appropriate royalties to performing rights organizations like ASCAP, BMI, SESAC and GEMA in Germany.

=== Historical devices ===
- The 1959 Seeburg 1000 was a stack record player, playing both sides continuous and repeating up to 1000 songs and up to 25 special 9 in (230 mm) vinyl records with a 2 in (51 mm) center bore at 16 2/3 RPM.
- The Rowe Customusic was an endless tape cartridge player, loading simultaneous six C-type Fidelipac cartridges.
- The 1964 3M Cantata 700 played continuous and auto-reversing one of its large and proprietary magnetic tape cartridges, containing up to 26 hours of music.
- Rediffusion’s Reditune system was popular in the 1960s UK.

== See also ==
- Ambient music
- DMX
- Elevator music
- Jamendo
- Production music
- PlayNetwork
- Sound effect
- Soundtrack
