= List of killings by law enforcement officers in the United States, November 2012 =

This is a list of people reported killed by non-military law enforcement officers in the United States in November 2012, whether in the line of duty or not, and regardless of reason or method. The listing documents the occurrence of a death, making no implications regarding wrongdoing or justification on the part of the person killed or officer involved. Killings are arranged by date of the incident that caused death. Different death dates, if known, are noted in the description. The table below lists 44 people.

== November 2012 ==
Date	Name (Age) of Deceased	State (City)	Description
2012-11-29	Russell, Timothy (43)	Ohio (Cleveland)	An officer witnessed a vehicle drive by at a high speed and reported that a gun was shot in his direction. That officer began pursuit and called for backup. Multiple officers in at least 30 patrol cars pursued a vehicle driven by Russell, and in which Williams was a passenger. After 22 miles of fleeing, their vehicle was blocked in the rear of a school. Russell then rammed a patrol car and drove towards an officer on foot. At that point 13 officers fired 137 rounds striking Russell 23 times and Williams 24 times. No gun was recovered from the vehicle. A minister who knew Russell later reported that Russell's car had a history of frequent backfires. On May 30, 2014, officer Michael Brelo was indicted on two counts of manslaughter in connection with the shooting. On May 23rd, 2015, Michael Brelo was ruled not guilty. Five police supervisors were also indicted for dereliction of duty.
2012-11-29	Williams, Malissa (30)	Ohio (Cleveland)	An officer witnessed a vehicle drive by at a high speed and reported that a gun was shot in his direction. That officer began pursuit and called for backup. Multiple officers in at least 30 patrol cars pursued a vehicle driven by Russell, and in which Williams was a passenger. After 22 miles of fleeing, their vehicle was blocked in the rear of a school. Russell then rammed a patrol car and drove towards an officer on foot. At that point 13 officers fired 137 rounds striking Russell 23 times and Williams 24 times. No gun was recovered from the vehicle. A minister who knew Russell later reported that Russell's car had a history of frequent backfires. On May 30, 2014, officer Michael Brelo was indicted on two counts of manslaughter in connection with the shooting. On May 23rd, 2015, Michael Brelo was ruled NOT Guilty. Five police supervisors were also indicted for dereliction of duty.
2012-11-29	Hallett, Donald (44)	Oklahoma (Tulsa)	Hallett was shot and killed when a Tulsa Fugitive Task Force attempted to serve an arrest warrant. It was reported that Hallett met the officers with a shotgun and failed to comply with the officers orders.
2012-11-28	Scott, David (45)	Texas (Pampa)	Officers responded to a reported domestic dispute. A man part of the dispute was fatally shot after pointing a gun at officers
2012-11-28	Almy, Bradley (34)	Georgia (Dunwoody)	Officers noted a car driving erratically in the police department parking lot. When officers tried to stop the vehicle, Almy drove away, striking multiple vehicles. When Almy accelerated towards officers on foot directing traffic, one officer fired once, striking Almy. He drove a short distance further before stopping. Almy died at a local hospital.
2012-11-27	Suarez-Reyes, Alexis (47)	Florida (Miami)	
2012-11-25	Warren, Lebron (23)	Florida (Doral)	
2012-11-25	McFadden, Ricky (47)	New Jersey (Leonia)	Officers approached McFadden regarding a recent knifepoint robbery of a nearby store. Three of four officers opened fire on McFadden, fatally shooting him. A knife and stolen items were recovered.
2012-11-23	unnamed male	Georgia (Decatur)	Officers fatally shot the suspect who was apparently attempting to steal a patrol car. The suspect had just prior demanded car keys of a pedestrian and a witness heard officers command the suspect to "put the knife down."
2012-11-22	unnamed male	Michigan (Detroit)	An off-duty officer intervened in an argument between a man and the man's girlfriend at a gas station. The officer and man exchanged gunshots. The officer was injured and the man killed.
2012-11-18	Ambrose, Derrick, Jr. (22)	Iowa (Waterloo)	Police were responding to a report of a fight with possible shots fired and spotted Ambrose with a gun. Ambrose allegedly refused to drop the weapon and fled down the street. Officer Kyle Law pursued Ambrose and shot him in the head when he stepped out from behind a tree. Ambrose had a permit to carry weapons. The investigation of this incident is being submitted to a grand jury.
2012-11-18	unnamed male	Oklahoma (Moore)	An officer stopped a vehicle for impaired driving. When the officer approached the vehicle, the driver accelerated towards the officer who fatally shot him.
2012-11-17	Crawley, Stephen (53)	California (Hanford)	Stephen Crawley, 53, was shot three times around noon Nov. 17, 2012, after deputies responded to his Kansas Avenue home to a 911 report of him threatening his brother with a golf club. The first deputy to arrive had tried to make contact with Stephen Crawley, alone in the house, and to calm him down. One of the last deputies to arrive had confronted and shot Stephen Crawley within six minutes of his arrival.
2012-11-15	Gloria Jean Murray (66)	Georgia (Cartersville)	A woman was killed as officers attempted to serve a drug search warrant.
2012-11-14	Wilson, Michael (20)	Illinois (Chicago)	Officers responded to a disturbance and arrived to find one man stabbing another. When ordered to stop, the man pulled a hammer from his pocket and approached the officers swinging the hammer. A Taser was deployed but was ineffective. Both officers fired at least 30times, killing the man.
2012-11-14	Toloza, José (35)	California (Compton)	Deputies approached Toloza for an unspecified reason and he fled on foot. A struggle ensued, and at least one deputy shot and killed the man after he allegedly tried to grab one of their guns.
2012-11-14	Rowell, Paul Edward (39)	South Carolina (Bluffton)	A retired officer shot and killed an intruder after a struggle in his home.
2012-11-14	unnamed male (19)	Pennsylvania (Philadelphia)	Officers responding to report of domestic violence arrived to find a woman with multiple gunshot wounds in front of the home. When a man at the scene pointed a gun at officers, they shot him. He died at the scene from a single gunshot wound.
2012-11-12	Coutinho, Bryce (22)	Massachusetts (Marlborough)	Officers responded to a report of a domestic disturbance regarding an unwanted person at the residence. When they arrived, they were confronted by a man armed with a knife whom they fatally shot.
2012-11-12	unnamed male (34)	Pennsylvania (Philadelphia)	The man was shot after pointing a gun at police.
2012-11-11	Collins, Harold Joseph (64)	Michigan (Southfield)	Collins entered a police department lobby and pointed a handgun at an officer without saying anything. Officers ordered Collins to drop the weapon. When he did not, gunfire was exchanged, injuring one officer and killing Collins.
2012-11-11	unnamed male (35)	Pennsylvania (Philadelphia)	Officers stopped a suspicious man riding a bike. The man was holding a gun, which the officers ordered him to drop. He refused and resisted it being taken away. When he pointed the gun at an officer, an officer opened fire. The man was shot once in the chest and pronounced dead at the scene.
2012-11-11	Dakota Bright (15)	Illinois (Chicago)	A 15-year-old who allegedly pointed a gun at officers was shot in the head by police in the South Side's Greater Grand Crossing neighborhood, authorities said. Officers said they saw Dakota Bright with a handgun The police state that officers approached, Dakota fled on foot, the officers chased him. During the pursuit, the officers shot Dakota. A weapon was recovered at the scene, police said. Bright, of the 7600 block of South Emerald, was declared dead on the scene at 4:11 p.m., according to the Cook County medical examiner's office. Officials at the morgue said Saturday that the cause of death was a gunshot wound to the head, and they could not provide further details.
2012-11-11	unnamed male	Utah (Ogden)	Barricaded himself inside a home after allegedly shooting at police, who returned fire. When SWAT eventually entered the home, the man was dead. Police were responding to a domestic violence incident.
2012-11-10	De la Trinidad, Jose (36)	California (Compton)	Police attempted a traffic stop on a vehicle in which De la Trinidad was a passenger. After a brief chase, he got out of the car and deputies shot him five times in the back, according to an autopsy. Police maintain that the man was reaching for his waistband when deputies shot at him. He was unarmed.
2012-11-10	unnamed male	Colorado (Denver)	Shot to death by a police officer after allegedly stabbing that officer with a sword.
2012-11-10	DeVillena, Allan II	California (Palm Springs)	A Marine was shot to death in a parking deck by two officers on bicycle patrol. The officers went to investigate when they heard a disturbance from two vehicles. Police say the man was not armed.
2012-11-09	Davies, James (35)	Colorado (Denver)	Officers from multiple police agencies responded to a report of gunshots at a home. Officer Davies was in full uniform investigating the scene when another officer fatally shot him.
2012-11-09	Heenan, Paul H. (30)	Wisconsin (Madison)	Heenan, the former guitarist for the band Monovox, was shot and killed during a confrontation with an officer outside a home. Heenan had entered the home very early in the morning and a female resident called the police, while her husband went to investigate. There is confusion over why Heenan entered the home; the incident was called in as a burglary, but friends of Hennan say that he was new to the neighborhood and entered the wrong house by mistake.
2012-11-09	unnamed male	California (Los Angeles)	Officers responded to a bank robbery and followed suspect for 45 miles. The suspect was cornered after turning into a dead-end street. Officers fatally shot suspect after he shot at officers.
2012-11-08	McCord, Xavier (20)	Illinois (Maywood)	Officers responded to a call at an apartment building. McCord fled, then raised a gun toward an officer who shot him multiple times in the chest.
2012-11-08	unnamed male	Kentucky (Flemingsburg)	Officers responded to a report of domestic violence. A husband had been fighting with his wife and continued to threaten her. Backup officers arrived and the husband's threats escalated to the point that an officer felt threatened enough to fire his weapon, killing the suspect.
2012-11-07	Hoey, Justin (36)	Nevada (Henderson)	Officers were responding to a domestic dispute and found a man in a draining ditch who they say was armed with a gun and threatening suicide. Officers shot the man to death after he allegedly pointed the gun at them.
2012-11-06	Burgess, Lamont (36)	Florida (St. Petersburg)	Two undercover officers came across a burglary-in-progress and shot and killed a male suspect who allegedly pointed a gun at them.
2012-11-04	unnamed male	Texas (Houston)	Officers responded to a report of a disturbance with a weapon. When officers arrived, the suspect raised a weapon toward police who shot at him. The man then barricaded himself in his home and a four-hour standoff ensued. During the standoff the suspect fired multiple rounds at the SWAT team that had surrounded his house. When the suspect pointed a weapon with a laser sight at an officer, the suspect was fatally shot.
2012-11-04	unnamed male (37)	California (Fremont)	Officers were responding to a domestic disturbance call and reportedly found a naked man with a knife chasing a woman, who they later determined to be his estranged wife. Two officers shot and killed the man when he refused to drop the knife.
2012-11-03	Fuller, Daniel Ross (46)	Florida (Port St. Lucie)	Police SWAT were responding to a report of an armed suicidal man. Gunfire was exchanged; one officer was reportedly shot in the arm, and the suicidal man was killed.
2012-11-03	Rivera, David Dale (52)	Texas (Snyder)	Officers responded to a report of a man threatening to kill his one-year-old son, his girlfriend and himself. When officers arrived, he lunged towards them with a knife in each hand. An officer shot Rivera who died at a local hospital.
2012-11-02	Daniels, Matt (24)	Michigan (Battle Creek)	Officers were responding to a report that a man had attacked his stepfather. When they arrived, Daniels allegedly attacked a responding officer who then shot and killed him.
2012-11-02	Willard, Danielle (21)	Utah (West Valley City)	Willard was shot and killed by undercover officer Shaun Cowley of the West Valley City Police Department in the parking lot of an apartment complex. Cowley and his partner Kevin Salmon opened fire at Willard's car, claiming that she tried to run them over. Salt Lake County district attorney Sim Gill determined that the shooting was legally unjustified before filing manslaughter charges against Cowley in June 2014. Willard's mother, Melissa Kennedy, said she hoped for murder charges but was satisfied with Gill's decision. Salmon was not charged as none of his shots hit Willard. Cowley was also fired after the shooting, but for mishandling evidence related to the case rather than for the shooting itself.
2012-11-02	Newsom, Evan F. (17)	Virginia (Stafford)	While investigating a single vehicle crash and abandoned vehicle, officers approached Newsom at a home where he allegedly attacked a deputy with a knife. Officers opened fire and killed him. The deputy who was allegedly attacked suffered superficial wounds.
2012-11-02	unnamed male	Nevada (Las Vegas)	Police were called when a man threatened to take hostages when an apartment manager tried to evict him. Officers shot and killed the man as he allegedly held a knife the throat of a woman he grabbed off of the street. Police said he ignored their commands to release her.
2012-11-02	Miles, Keith E. (25)	Washington (Littlerock)	Officers came to Miles' parents' home when they suspected he had thrown rocks through a grocery store window, recognizing his truck from a surveillance tape. One officer shot and killed Miles as he allegedly threatened them with a pool cue.
2012‑11‑02	Webb, Michael J (56)	Florida (Pompano Beach)	Officers responded to bank robbery and chased suspect. An officer's immobilization maneuver caused the suspect to crash his vehicle. Other officers noted the suspect was armed as he crawled out of the wreckage, and fatally shot him.

== See also ==
- Death in custody § United States
- Henry A. Wallace Police Crime Public Database
- List of cases of police brutality
- List of countries with annual rates and counts for killings by law enforcement officers
- List of law enforcement officers killed in the line of duty in the United States
- List of law enforcement officers convicted for an on-duty killing in the United States
- List of police reforms related to the George Floyd protests
- List of unarmed African Americans killed by law enforcement officers in the United States
- Lists of killings by law enforcement officers
- Police brutality in the United States
- Police misconduct § United States
- Police riot § United States
- Police use of deadly force in the United States
