= Muzak =

Brand of background music

Muzak LLC
- Final logo, used from 1998 to 2013
- Type: Private
- Industry: Background music; Marketing
- Founded: 1934 in New York City
- Founder: George Owen Squier
- Defunct: 2011 (acquired); 2013 (brand retired)
- Fate: Acquired by Mood Media
- Successor: Mood Media
- Headquarters: Fort Mill, South Carolina, US
- Website: muzak.com archived January 2011

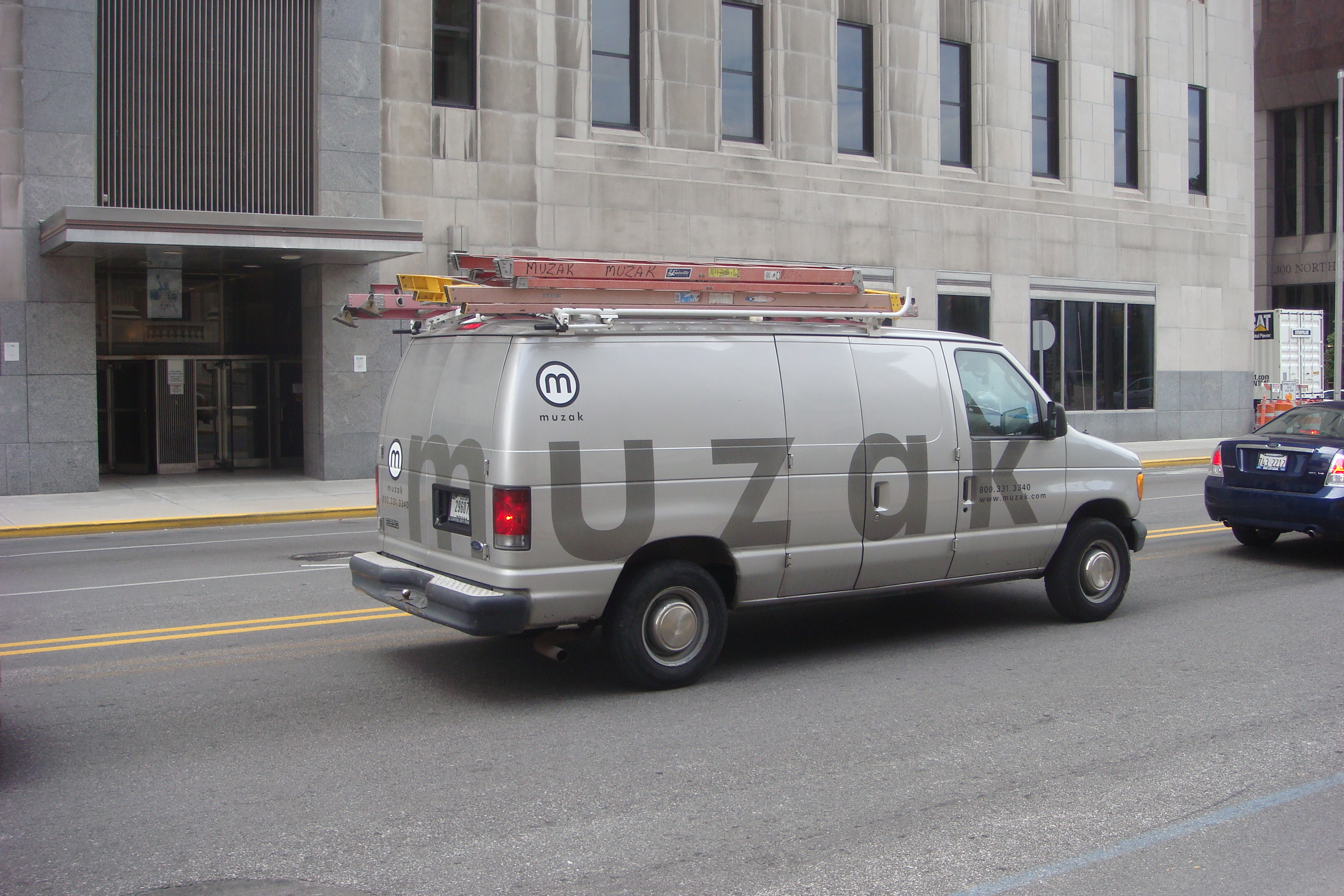
A Muzak van in Indianapolis, Indiana

Muzak was an American brand and company which provided background music played in retail stores and other public establishments.

The name Muzak, a blend of "music" and the popular camera brand name Kodak, was introduced in 1934. The word Muzak has been a registered trademark of Muzak LLC since December 21, 1954. The Muzak brand was retired in 2013, shortly after Mood Media purchased the company in 2011. Muzak LLC still exists as a legal entity, but all of its operations were ceased and integrated into Mood Media.

In August 1981, Westinghouse acquired the company when it bought Teleprompter Corporation and ran it until selling it to Field Enterprises of Chicago, publishers of the Chicago Sun-Times, on September 8, 1986. Muzak was based in various Seattle, Washington, locations from 1986 to 1999, after which it moved its headquarters to outside Charlotte in 2000. Muzak LLC was purchased in 2011 by Mood Media in a deal worth US$345 million.

In the United States, due in part to the market dominance of Muzak Holdings, Muzak came to be used to refer to most forms of background music, regardless of source. The term is also commonly used in English vernacular as a pejorative for music considered bland and insubstantial. This makes Muzak an example of a genericized trademark. Muzak may also be referred to as "elevator music" or "lift music" (see also music on hold). Though Muzak Holdings was for many years the best-known supplier of background music, and is commonly associated with elevator music, the company itself did not supply music to elevators.

== History ==
Inventor George Owen Squier, credited with inventing telephone carrier multiplexing in 1910, developed the original technical basis for Muzak. He was granted several US patents in the 1920s related to transmission of information signals, among them U.S. patent 1,641,608 a system for the transmission and distribution of signals over electrical lines.

Squier recognized the potential for this technology to be used to deliver music to listeners without the use of radio, which at the time was in early state and required fussy and expensive equipment. Early successful tests were performed, delivering music to customers on New York's Staten Island via their electrical wires.

In 1922, the rights to Squier's patents were acquired by the North American Company utility conglomerate, which created the firm Wired Radio, Inc., to deliver music to their customers, charging them for music on their electric bill. By the 1930s radio had made great advances, and households began listening to broadcasts received via the airwaves free of charge, supported by advertising.

=== Focus on mercantile environment (1934–1950) ===
Squier remained involved in the project, but as the home market became eclipsed by radio in 1934 he changed the company's focus to delivering music to commercial clients. Intrigued by the made-up word Kodak used as a trademark, he combined it with "music" to create the word Muzak, which became the company's new name.

In 1937, the Muzak division was purchased from the North American Company by Warner Bros., which expanded it into other cities. It was bought by entrepreneur William Benton who wanted to introduce Muzak into new markets like barbershops and doctors' offices. While Muzak had initially produced tens of thousands of original artist recordings by the top performers of the late 1930s and 1940s, their new strategy required a different sound.

=== Stimulus progression (1950–1986) ===
The company began customizing the pace and style of the music provided throughout the workday in an effort to maintain productivity. The music was programmed in 15-minute blocks, gradually getting faster in tempo and louder and brassier in instrumentation, to encourage workers to speed up their pace. Following the completion of a 15-minute segment, the music would fall silent for 15 minutes. This was partly done for technical reasons, but company-funded research also showed that alternating music with silence limited listener fatigue, and made the "stimulus" effect of Stimulus Progression more effective.

During this period, Muzak began recording with a number of orchestras in studios around the country, with the majority primarily being based in New York, composed of top local studio musicians. This allowed them to control all aspects of the music for insertion into specific slots in the Stimulus Progression programs.

Muzak's popularity remained high through the mid-1960s. President Dwight D. Eisenhower was the first president to pump Muzak into the West Wing, and Lyndon B. Johnson owned the Muzak franchise in Austin, Texas. NASA reportedly used Muzak in many of its space missions to soothe astronauts and occupy periods of inactivity.

When Rod Baum became VP of programming in 1979, he sought to diversify Muzak's sound by recording with studios from across the country and overseas. Baum began working with London-based arranger Syd Dale to record covers and original compositions for Muzak's library, who he described as being "one of the few who can produce the specifics we want and still use imagination." Syd Dale was one of the primary arrangers for Muzak during this time period, along with arranger-conductor Dick Lieb who recorded sessions for Muzak at RCA Studios in New York.

=== New business model ===
Muzak was, since 1938, a franchise operation, with local offices, alongside corporate locations in select urban areas, providing installation services and background music. Franchises were barred from altering programming and were only allowed to use tapes and other media officially supplied by Muzak.

Through the 1980s and 1990s, Muzak moved away from the "elevator music" approach and instead began to offer multiple specialized channels of popular music. Muzak pioneered "audio architecture", a process of designing custom music playlists for specific customers.

During this time, Muzak expanded their offerings beyond music and began to sell, install, and maintain equipment such as drive-thru systems and closed-circuit television (CCTV), leveraging their already existing infrastructure for installing equipment in ceilings.

In 1984, Muzak began to offer foreground music, known as TONES, through a private label agreement with Yesco. In 1985, Muzak launched their own foreground music service, known as Foreground Music One. Muzak eventually merged with Yesco on December 31, 1986, as part of their initiative to strengthen their presence in the foreground music industry.

Even with the changes in format, rocker Ted Nugent used Muzak as an icon of everything "uncool" about music. In 1986, he publicly made a $10 million bid to purchase the company with the stated intent of shutting it down. "Muzak is an evil force in today's society, causing people to lapse into uncontrollable fits of blandness," Nugent said. "It's been responsible for ruining some of the best minds of our generation." His bid was refused by Muzak's then-owner, the Westinghouse Electric Corporation. In 1989, following Nugent's criticism of the company, the Jim Devlin Orchestra recorded an instrumental cover of "Journey to the Center of the Mind" for Muzak's Environmental channel, a tune Nugent co-wrote and performed with The Amboy Dukes.

In 1987, shortly after the Yesco merger, Bruce Funkhouser replaced Rod Baum as the VP of programming. Funkhouser made aggressive changes to Muzak programming with the launch of Music Plus in 1988, introducing five satellite-delivered channels: Foreground Music One, Hitline, New Age Contemporary, Light Classical, and Environmental Music by Muzak. Music Plus was later expanded to offer 12 channels in 1992, eventually being expanded to 16 channels by 1995.

During the transition to popular music, the Stimulus Progression format continued to be offered through the Environmental channel. In an effort to support and embrace their new local community, Muzak began collaborating with Seattle artists, such as Lennie Moore, Donny Marrow, and John Morton to record covers for the newly revamped Environmental channel. Instead of creating unique renditions, covers were arranged to sound similar to the original, with vocals being replaced by either a piano, woodwind, or guitar. In 1987, Muzak established relations with Donny Marrow of Disk Eyes Productions to produce the majority of the cover library for the Environmental channel, and to serve as their primary A&R consultant. By 1995, the Environmental channel had 5000 tracks.

In 1993, Muzak launched Latin Styles, the company's first channel specifically targeting Spanish-speaking customers. Melody Inc, a Muzak franchise based in Miami, expected at least 100 of its 2000 clients in Dade and Broward county to switch to the program.

In 1998, Foreground Music One (FM-1) was the most popular Muzak program in South Florida, making up 30% of sales, with Environmental being the second most popular in the region at 20%. Environmental represented less than 10% of sales nationally.

By the late 1990s, the Muzak corporation had largely rebranded itself. As of 2010, Muzak distributed 3 million commercially available original artist songs. It offered almost 100 channels of music via satellite or IP delivery, in addition to completely custom music programs tailored to their customers' needs.

According to EchoStar, one of Muzak's distribution providers, Muzak's business music service was broadcast on rented bandwidth from EchoStar VII, in geostationary orbit at 119 degrees west longitude. Other rented bandwidth included an analog service on Galaxy 3C and a digital service on SES-3.

On April 12, 2007, Muzak Holdings LLC announced to its employees that it might merge with DMX Music. This merger was approved by the Department of Justice Antitrust Division one year later. However, by April 2009, the deal appeared to have faltered.

On January 23, 2009, a spokesperson said Muzak was attempting to restructure its debt, and filing for bankruptcy was one of several options. The company had ample cash but had large amounts of debt coming due in the midst of a difficult economic climate.

=== Bankruptcy ===
On February 10, 2009, Muzak Holdings LLC filed for Chapter 11 bankruptcy protection. Kirkland & Ellis was hired as the company's bankruptcy law firm. Moelis & Company served as the financial advisor.

On September 10, 2009, Muzak said it had filed a reorganization plan which would cut the company's debt by more than 50%. The plan would pay all banks everything they were owed in some form and would give high-ranking unsecured creditors ownership in the reorganized company. Other creditors would receive warrants to buy stock. The company said an "overwhelming majority" of unsecured creditors supported the plan.

On January 12, 2010, the U.S. Bankruptcy Court approved the plan to reduce Muzak's debt by more than half, allowing Muzak to officially emerge from bankruptcy.

Following bankruptcy, the company announced an initiative to realign its corporate structure into three specialized business units: Muzak Media; Touch, a Muzak Co.; and Muzak Systems. These units will focus on content acquisition, Sensory Branding, and new delivery platform technology.

In March 2011, Mood Media agreed to purchase Muzak Holdings for $345 million. On February 5, 2013, Mood Media announced it was retiring the name 'Muzak' as part of its integration plans.

== Mood Media ==
Founded in 2004, Mood Media had a market capitalization of about $380 million as of 2011. In March 2011, Mood Media agreed to purchase Muzak Holdings for $345 million. Although Muzak first appeared in 1934, it had its largest impact in the 1960s and 1970s. In 2013, Mood Media announced it would be consolidating its services under the name Mood, ceasing to use the Muzak brand name. Muzak provided background music to over 300,000 US locations and made most of its money through multi-year contracts. In 2013, the company provided on-hold messaging and video programming, although piped music remained its forte. Mood hoped to use Muzak's US footprint to introduce more digital services. In May 2017, Mood Media filed for Chapter 15 bankruptcy protection in an attempt to restructure their debt. The following month the company was acquired by Apollo Global Management and GSO Capital Partners. In July 2020, Mood Media filed for bankruptcy, with the COVID-19 pandemic a major reason for its financial problems. The company emerged from bankruptcy in less than 24 hours due to the agreement of all stakeholders, a strong strategic plan, and a stable team. In January 2021 Mood Media was acquired by Vector Capital, a private equity firm specializing in investments in technology businesses.

== See also ==
- Associated-Rediffusion
- InStore Broadcasting Network
- Music Choice
- Music While You Work
- Trusonic
- Background music
  - 3M Cantata 700
  - Seeburg 1000
- Beautiful music radio format
- Easy listening
- Genericized trademark
