= MTI Digital =

American business music provider

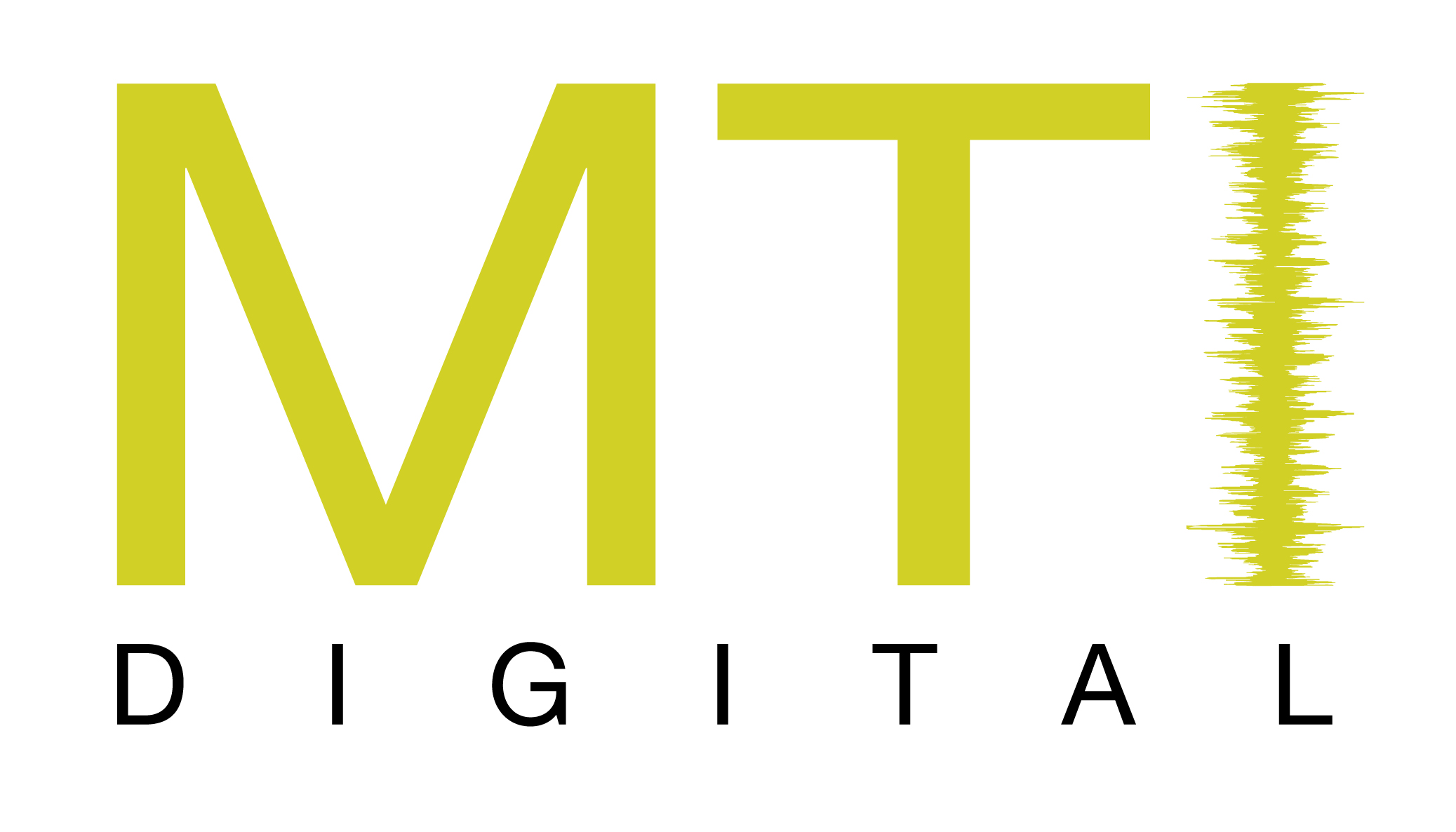
- Formerly: Music Technologies International
- Type: Private
- Industry: Retail Media
- Founded: Southfield, MI, (1988)
- Headquarters: Miami Beach, FL, US
- Area served: United States, Canada
- Key people: President Bradley Golden; Chairman Lorraine Golden
- Services: Business Music; Licensed Music Distribution; Sound system design and installation; Point of sale advertising; Digital Signage; Mobile Marketing
- Owner: Bradley Golden
- Website: mtimusic.com

MTI Digital is a provider of in-store music, advertising, digital signage, on-hold messaging and hold music for retail stores, supermarkets, convenience stores, and restaurants in the United States and Canada.

== Company History ==
MTI Digital was founded in 1988 as Music Technologies International by Lorraine Golden, who previously acted as general manager for Detroit radio stations WNIC and WQRS, and owner of WDTX. The company was founded as an alternative to the easy-listening elevator music that was common in retail stores of the 1980s, instead providing an experience similar to that of FM radio with popular music interspersed with commercial advertising.

MTI initially provided background music by satellite to retailers such as Kmart, tailoring the music and advertising to each specific retailer and its vendors. In 2000, the company partnered with fellow background music provider Muzak (now Mood Media) to focus on in-store advertising sales to retailers such as Toys "R" Us and Rite Aid. This partnership saw MTI's focus shift from background music to point of sale advertising targeted at a retailers’ customers for much of the next decade.

MTI ended its partnership with Muzak and pivoted back to in-store background music by 2009. The company rebranded as MTI Digital in the 2010s and now provides music and messaging via digital receivers rather than satellite, as well as digital signage, menu boards, and sound system design.

In 2024, Bradley Golden took over MTI. He joined the company in 1999 as general legal counsel after years in private practice.

MTI Digital today offers service to restaurants, retailers, convenience stores, discount department stores, hotels, and gas stations.

== System ==
MTI Digital's music and messages are delivered using a media player located at each location connected by the internet to MTI's servers. Audio advertisements and music playlists are digitally sent to on each player, ensuring that the content is up-to-date, and allowing MTI to customize the music and messaging program for each retailer and location.

== Clients ==
MTI provides music, audio messages, and digital signage primarily to national and regional convenience and retail stores as well as supermarkets and QSRs in the United States and Canada, including Signet Jewelers, Samsonite, EG America, Menards, Consumer Cellular, Wawa, Sonic Drive-in, Yesway and Allsups,, and EZCorp.
