= Sanyo Micro Pack 35 =

Portable audio tape device

Micro Pack 35
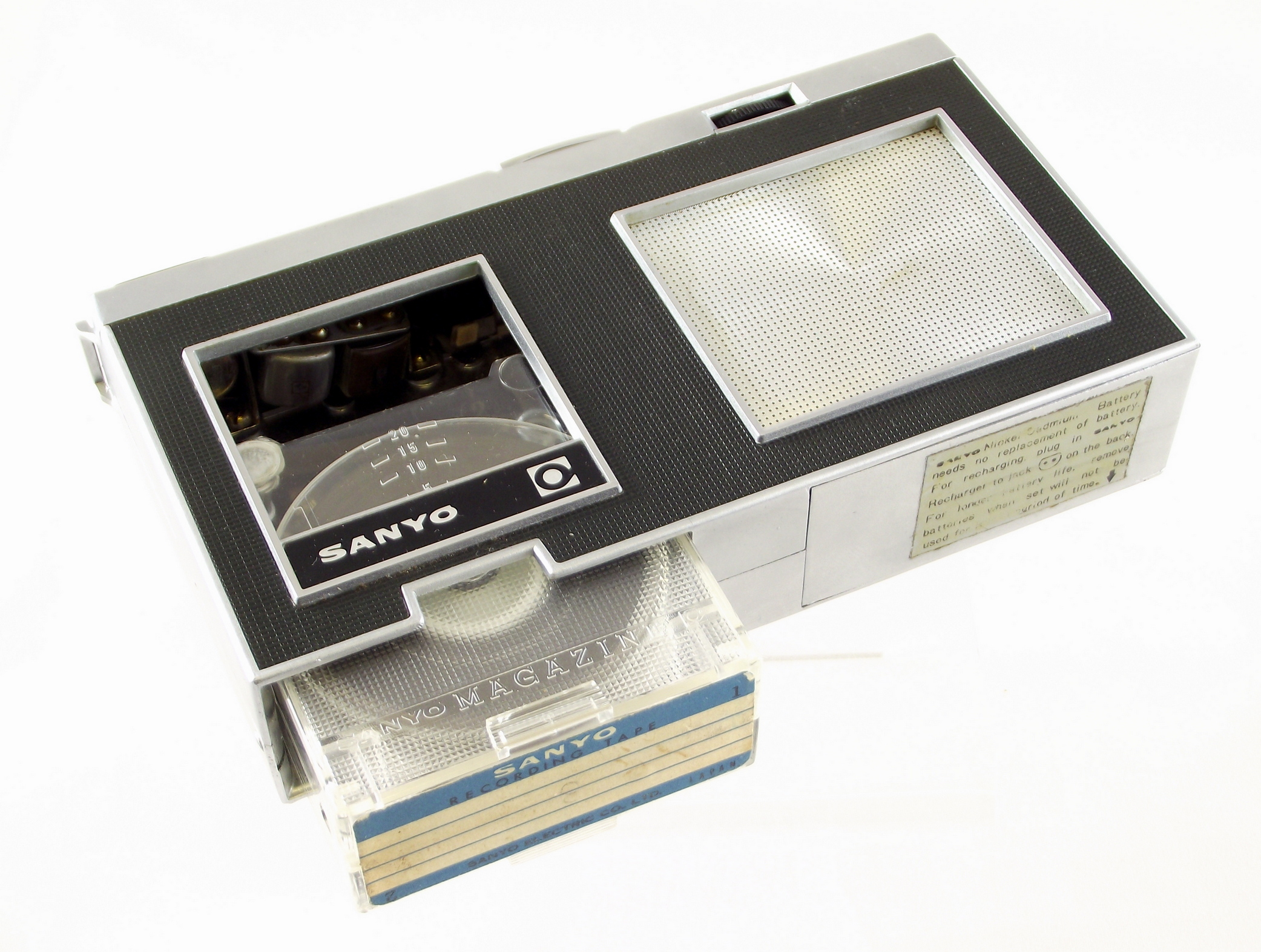
- Sanyo Micro-Pack 35 tape recorder showing cassette being inserted
- Media type: Magnetic tape cartridge
- Encoding: Analog signal
- Read mechanism: Tape head
- Write mechanism: Magnetic recording head
- Developed by: Sanyo
- Usage: Audio playback
- Released: 1964; 62 years ago

The Sanyo Micro Pack 35 was a portable magnetic audio tape recording device, developed by Sanyo in 1964, that employed a special tape cartridge format with tape reels atop each other.

The unit was rebadged and sold as the Channel Master 6546 and the Westinghouse H29R1.

== Device ==
Offered as a small "sound camera" type reel-to-reel audio tape recorder, the Sanyo Micro Pack 35 used a unique tape cartridge. The Sanyo Micro Pack 35 case and controls were designed to resemble a film camera. The unit was marketed for "capturing the first words of the child, terrorizing party guests and sending voice letters".

The compact styled device used a simplified drive mechanism for tape transport. There was no capstan. Instead, the motor driveshaft protruded into the cartridge between the tape reels pressing against a rubber coating. The whole motor tilted back and forth to press on one reel or the other which determined the tape direction. The changing amount of tape on the engaged reel caused a changing speed of tape transport and up to 1% wow and flutter. A control on top of the unit allowed the tape speed to be varied between Slow (low quality/long recording time) and Fast (better quality/short recording time).

The unit featured an input jack for a microphone, an output jack for an earphone and an internal speaker. The VU meter for monitoring the audio level on recording was used in playback mode as a charge level indicator of the four AA batteries.

== Cartridge ==
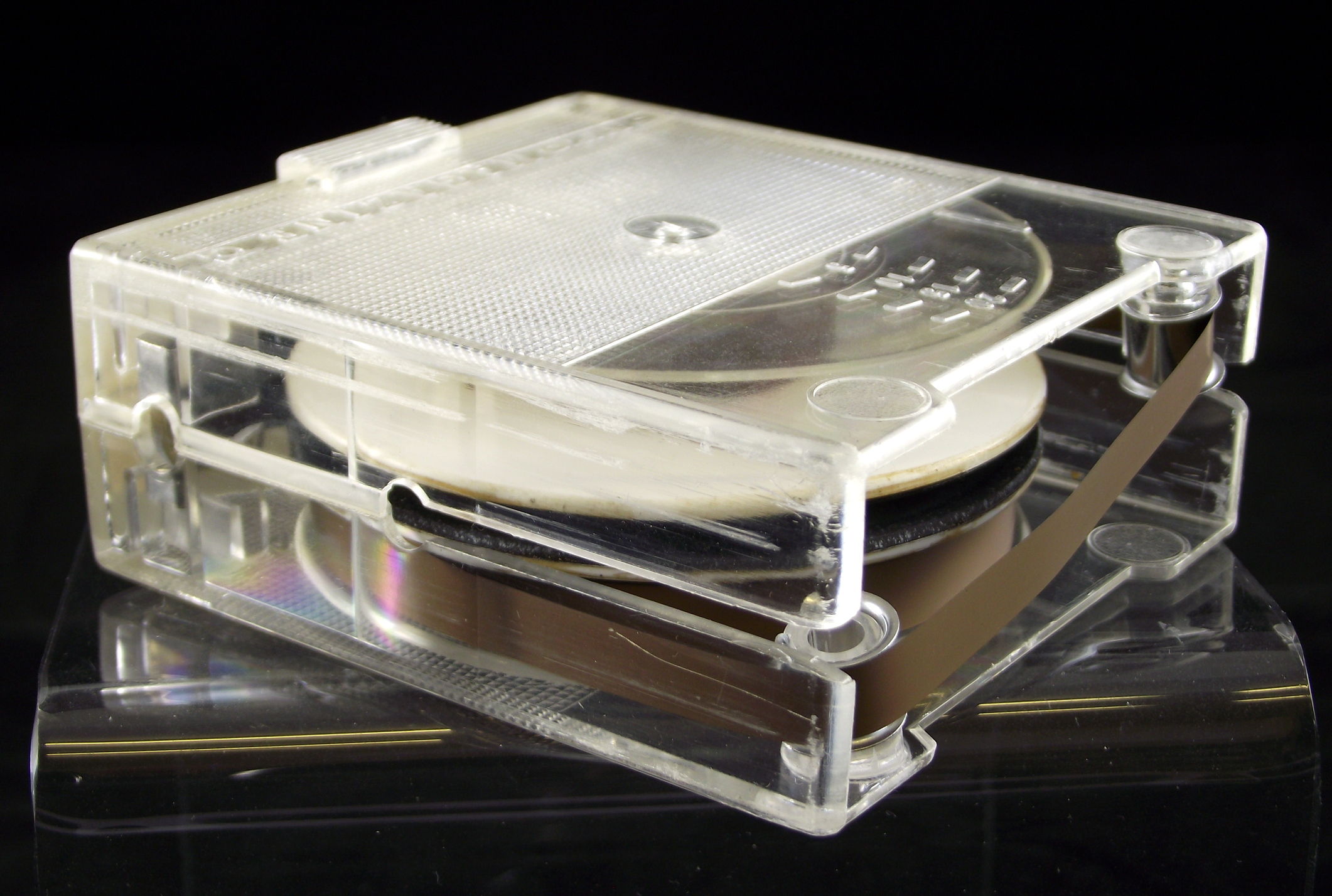
Sanyo Tapepack AS-20W for Micro-Pack 35 tape recorder

The recording cartridges were made of transparent plastic and measured 2.6 by 2.9 by 1.9 inches (6.6 cm × 7.4 cm × 4.8 cm).

The Channel Master version of the cartridge was labeled as the "Model 6595" and contained 250 feet (76 m) of tape. The ¼ inch wide magnetic tape was guided in a diagonal at the open upper side of the cartridge on tilted rollers in the upper corners in the cartridge. Inside the machine the drive tape head and erase head were installed in an equivalent tilted angle. The analog mono sound recording was a single track per side of the cartridge. Each end of the tape got a conductive mark to stop tape transport. A push button on top of the player was installed to override the conductive stripe and allow the cartridge to be played in the opposite direction. In all operating modes the cartridge was held in place by another pin which also disengaged the reel brake.

== Market ==
The high level of wow and flutter in the tape transport and the low frequency response made the device less useful for music. The format, which appeared a year after Compact Cassette soon lost market share.

== In popular media ==
An unbranded version of the Sanyo Micro Pack 35 was briefly featured in the 1967–68 series of The Prisoner in the episode "The General".
