= Rowe Customusic =

Rowe Customusic is a background music system from the 1960s and 1970s. Up to six Fidelipac type C endless-loop magnetic tape cartridges can be loaded in the player, allowing up to 60 hours of playback. The case is 13 5/8 in (350 mm) wide, 11 1/8 in (280 mm) high, and 13 3/4 in (350 mm) deep. Like the 3M Cantata 700, the player moves the tape head between cartridges and, as in other Fidelipac players, between the four tracks on a cartridge. The current cartridge number is indicated on a seven-segment display. Automatic track advancement was triggered by a conductive tape strip on the splice of the tape loop, or manually by pressing a button. Another switch located next to the power switch disables cartridge changeover, replaying only the current cartridge.
