= Audiotape =

Sound recording on magnetic tape

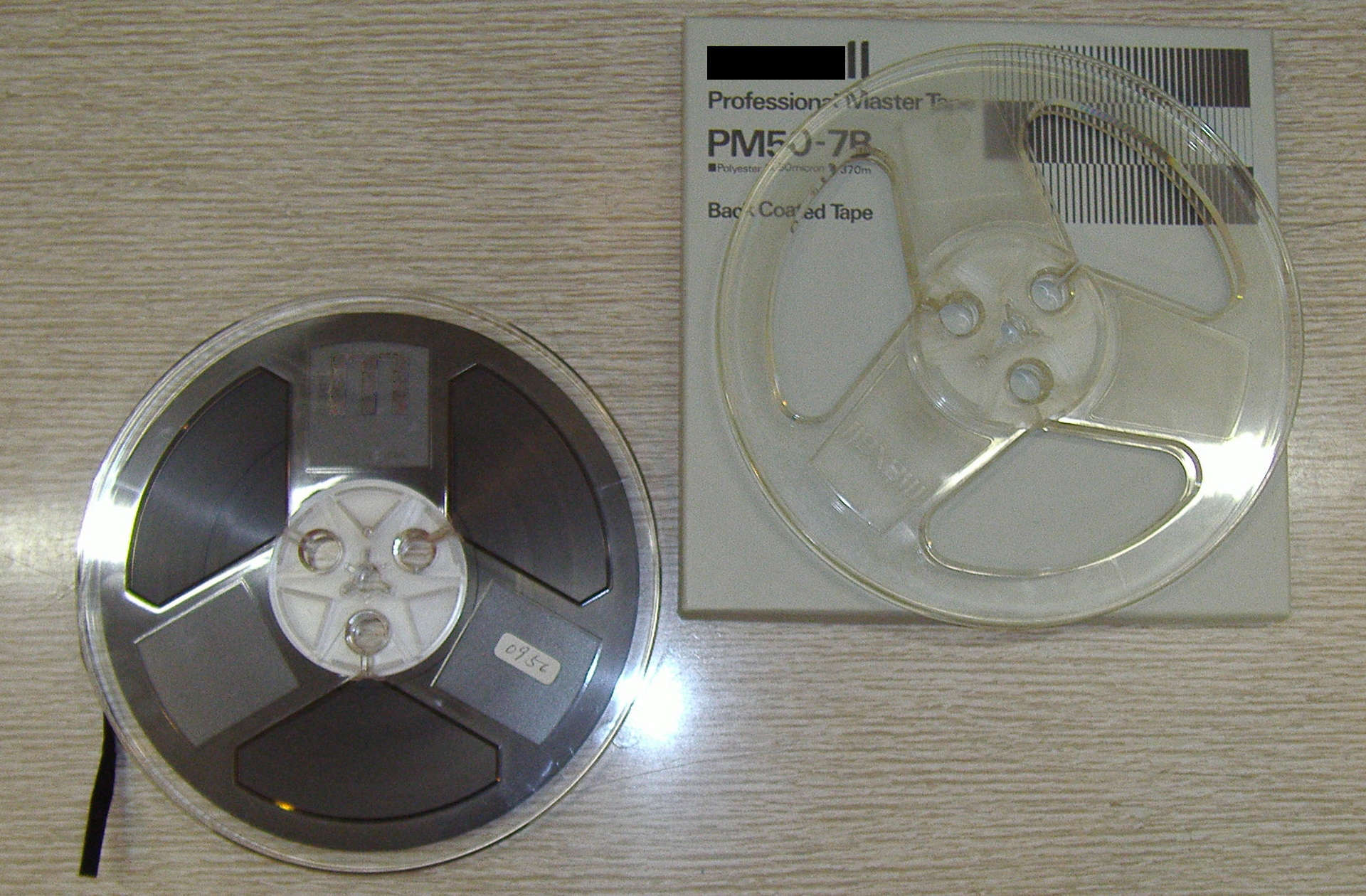
A blank 7 inch reel of 1/4 inch open reel tape made by Maxell

Audiotape is magnetic tape used for storing audio. Information stored can be in the form of either an analog or digital signal. Audiotape can be used in various tape recorders including machines for reel-to-reel audio tape recording on open reels or they can be enclosed in cases that only have one reel (tape cartridge) or two reels (cassette).

== History ==
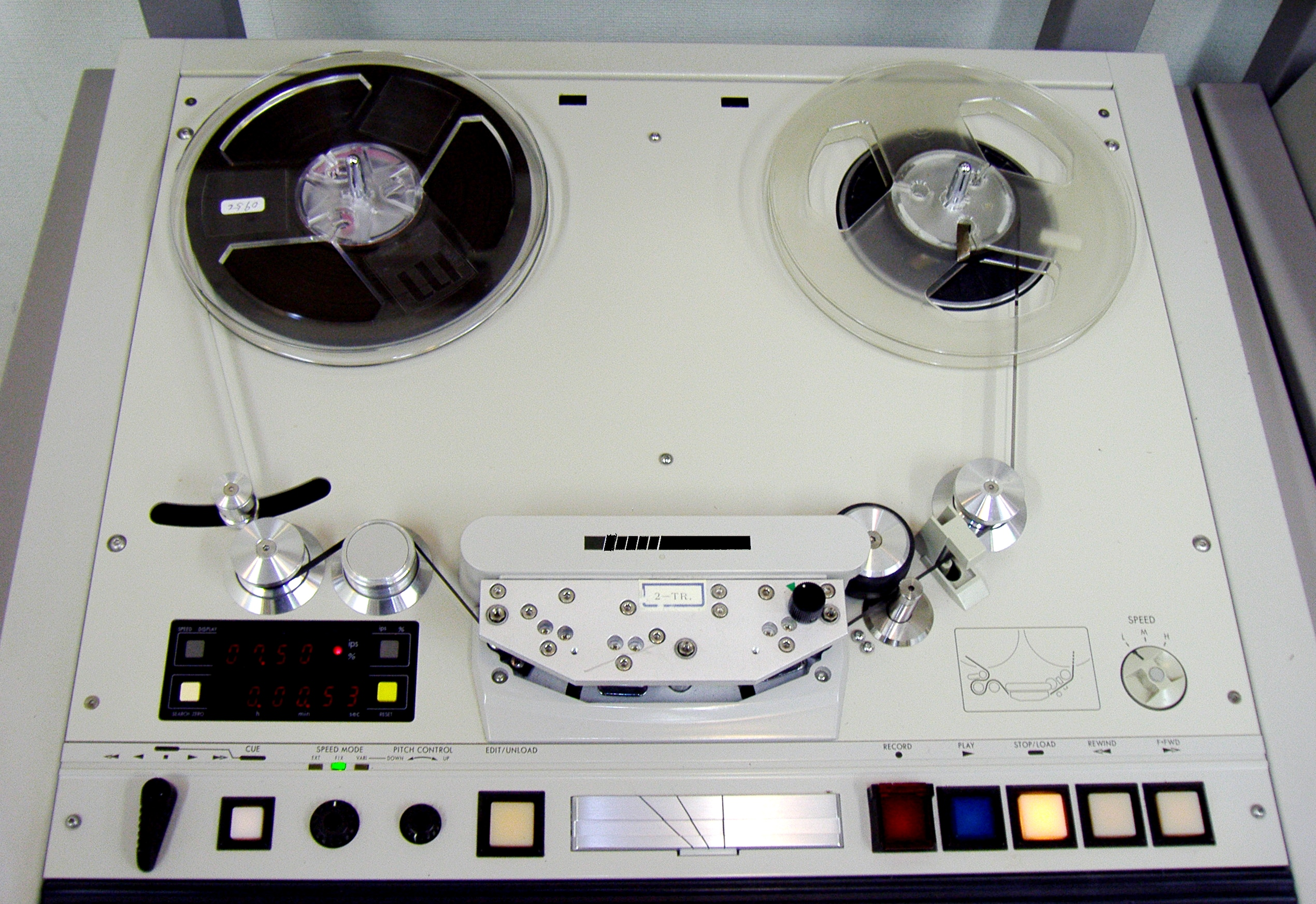
A tape recorder machine

The use of magnetic tape for sound recording can be traced back to 1924 when German engineer Kurt Stille developed a dictation machine that used steel wires called the Poulsen wire recorder. Louis Blattner, a German engineer working in Britain, licensed Stille's technology the following year and started work on a machine that would be able to record on a magnetic steel tape. The machine would later be called the Blattnerphone. The machine used steel tape that was 6 mm wide and 0.08 mm thick. It travelled at 5 feet per second and was able to record up to 20 minutes of audio. Although the tape was used by some organizations like the BBC, the quality was deemed not suitable for music recording so it was mainly used for dictation recording.

It wasn't until 1930s when the quality of tape improved when German company BASF made a new formula for the tape to be thinner and not use complete steel. The idea was based on Fritz Pfleumer's 1928 invention of paper tape with oxide powder lacquered onto it.

== Reel recording ==
The advancement of tape formulation and tape heads led to the increase capacity of recording audio and quality of the sound. The first machines to be able to read and record on tape did so using reels similar to film. At first, only news broadcasters used tape for recordings since the quality was not good but eventually, recording studios and record labels starting using the format to record music and albums.

The tape used by reel machines varied in size and formulation with various companies and even broadcasters using their own proprietary methods to record onto tape. The speed at which the tape was read was also important to these machines as a slower speed meant an audible hiss could be heard while playing back the recording. Eventually, standardization became more relevant and compatible formats were released for both professional recording and eventually home recording.

== Tape cartridges and cassettes ==
The advancements in technology also meant that tape could be stored in more compatible formats although with reduced quality in audio. The first releases featured tape wrapped around in a single reel known as "tape cartridges". There were tape cartridges for professional use like the Fidelipac and cartridges for consumers with 8-track cartridge.

Eventually the need to replicate reel to reel recording led to the creation of the "cassette" format, later also known as audiocassette, which utilized two reels inside. RCA released the first such format with the RCA tape cartridge which still used the cartridge name but it would be Philips that released the most viable and still popular format for audio cassette with the Compact Cassette. Philips also coined the word "cassette" for these plastic units, taking the word from French which meant "little case".
