= Tape cartridge =

Storage medium: cartridge containing a computer tape

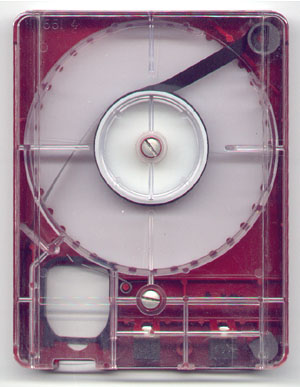
Fidelipac catridge

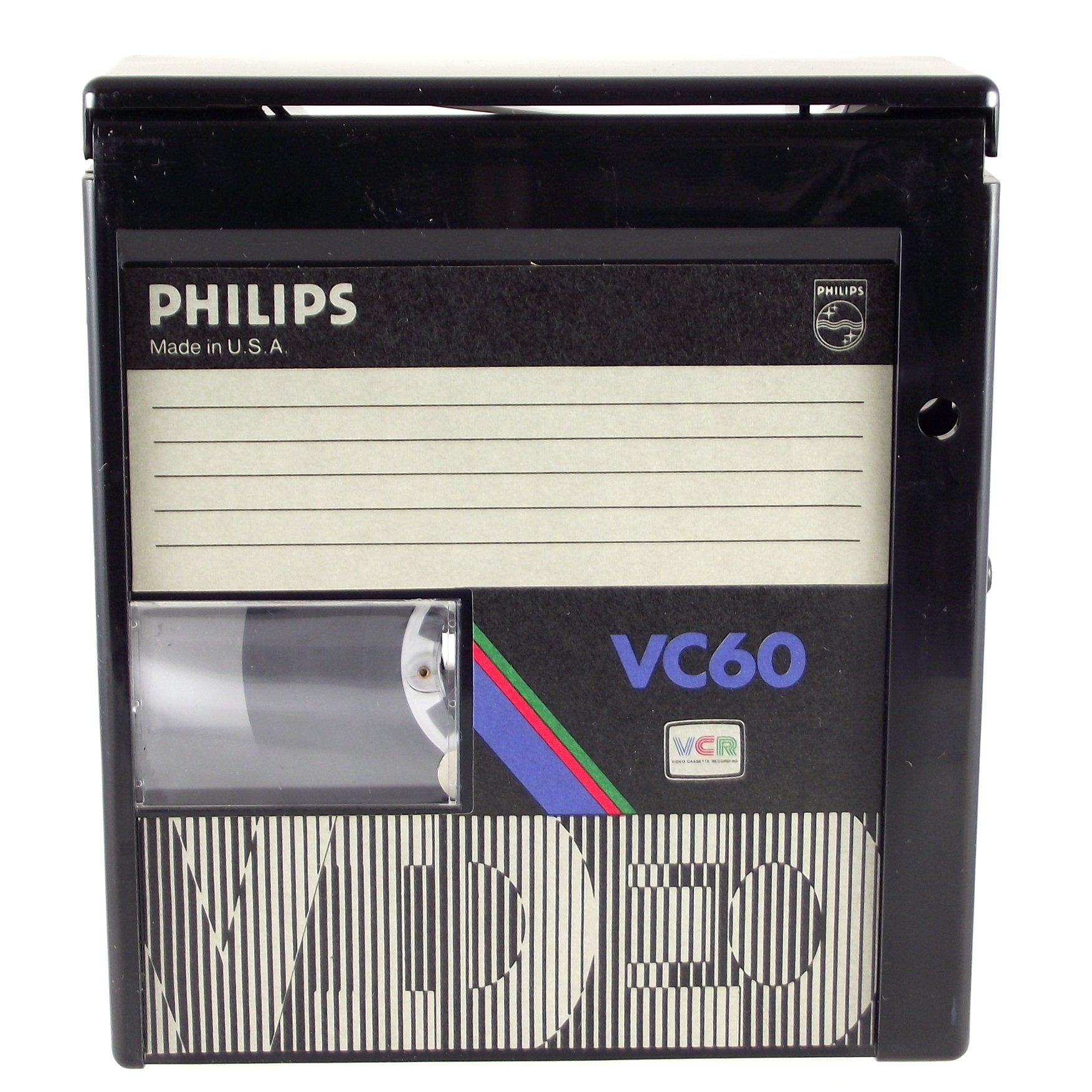
Video Cassette Recording cartridge

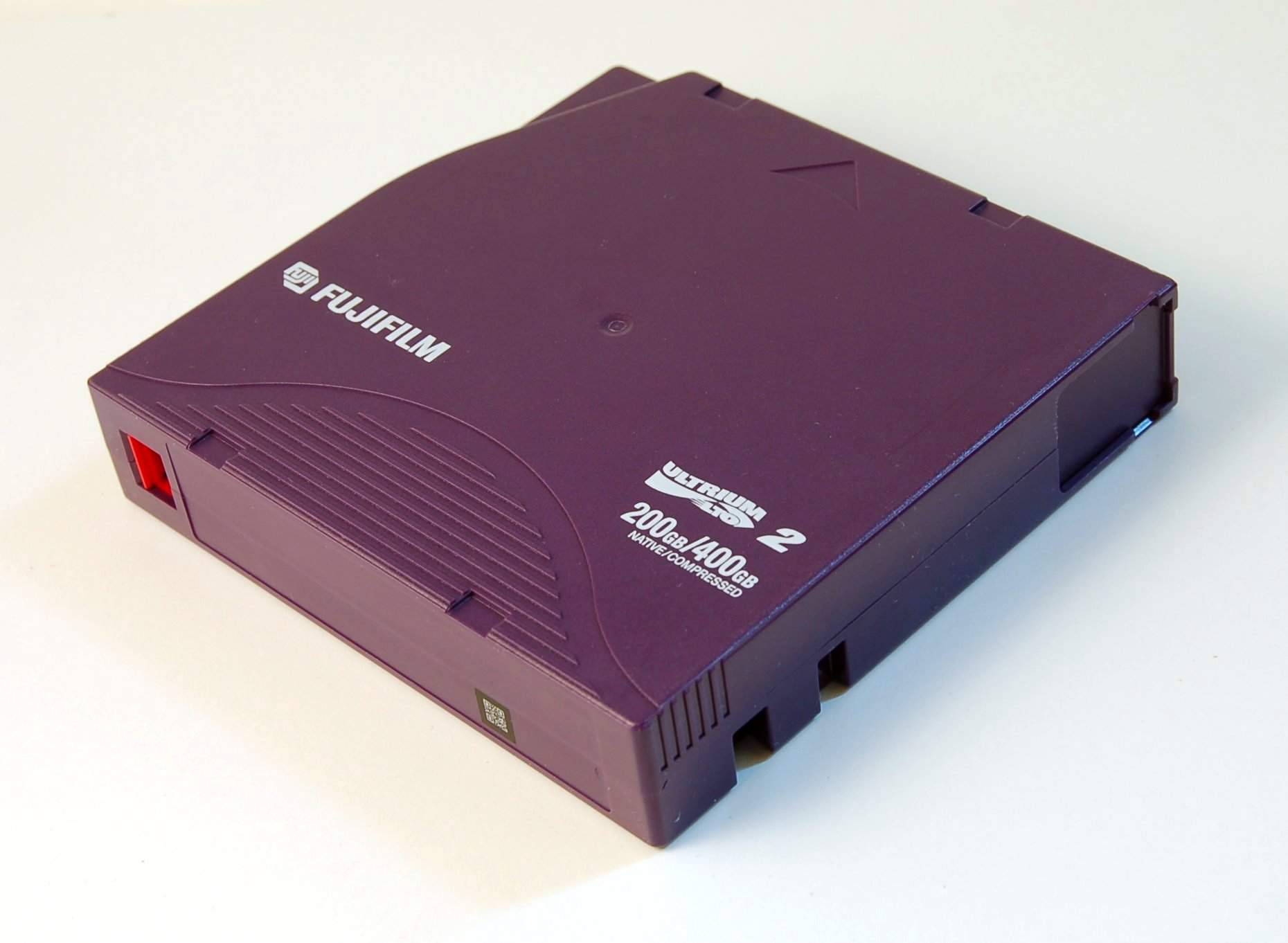
LTO cartridge

An example of tape cartridge formats for audio, video, and data storage

A tape cartridge, also known as a tape cart, is a storage medium used for audio recording, video recording, or data storage that includes a magnetic tape housed in a plastic unit that contains a single reel for the tape.

The format has become obsolete as an audio and video format but still remains in use for data storage for enterprise and commercial use with new formats and enhanced updates still being released.

== History ==
The beginning of tape cartridges goes back to loop recording, also known as endless tape recording, which in this case referred to the endless playback of tape read in the tape transport. This was first used in specialized open reel machines that would continuously record or play an endless loop. Endless tape recording was ideal for security footage when the tape was necessary to be stored while endless playback was mainly used for audio.

Setting up a reel to reel machine for playback was a common nuisance as it took a lot of time to set up and make sure the tape was properly loaded into the machines for use. Many designers saw this as the biggest issue for reel machines and this led to many of them trying to come up with an easier way of playing back the tape. In the early 1950s, George Eash experimented with putting magnetic tape inside a bin that would play it back. He would later change the development and house the tape inside a plastic shell. He patented the design and then took it to a Chicago company who named the unit Fidelipac and become the first tape cartridge format. While the quality of the recording was not as good as reel machines due to the smaller unit, it gained prominence at radio stations to play commercials and music. Businesses also used the format to play background music in stores.

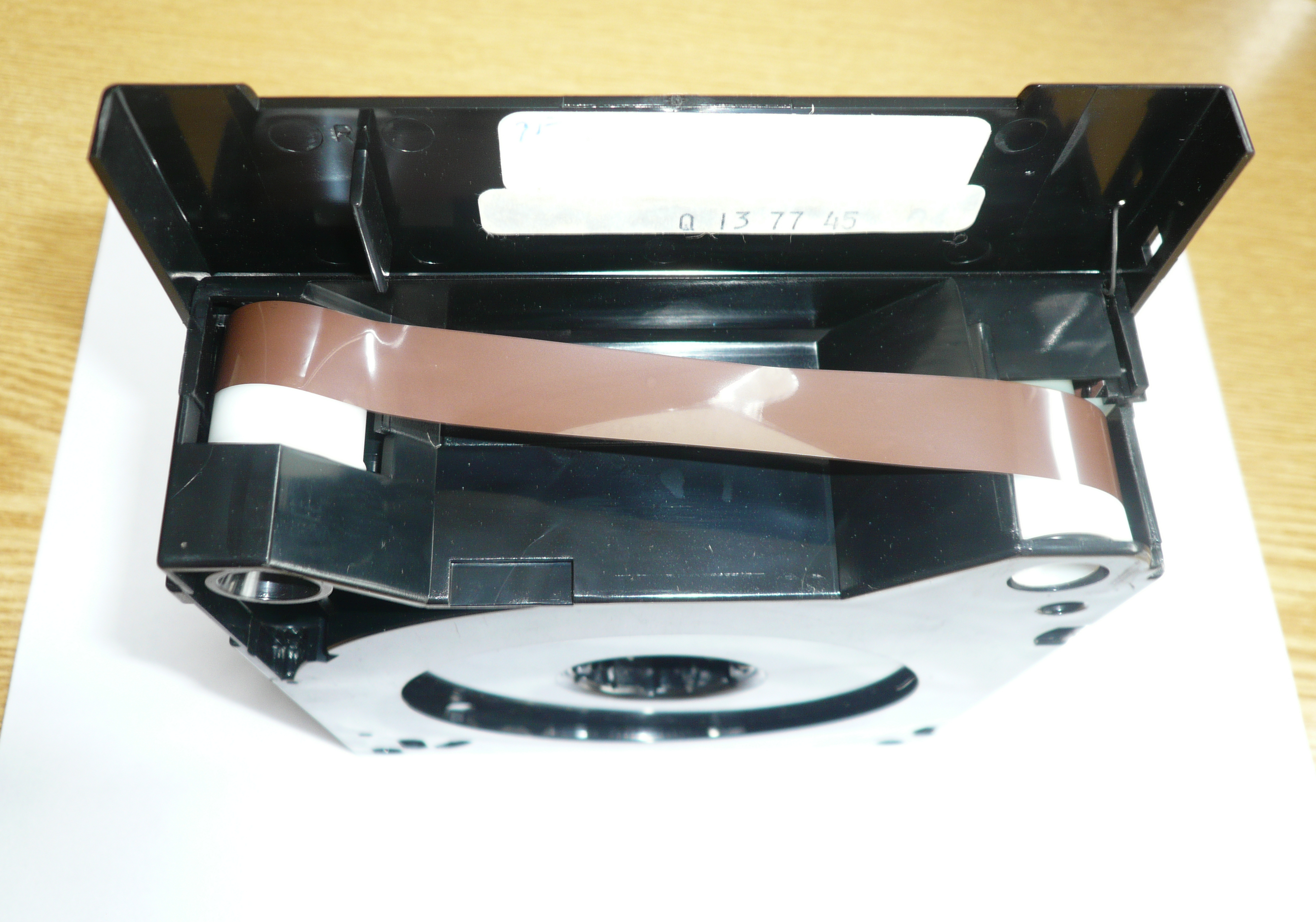
The top of a Video Cassette Recording tape cartridge.

The tape cartridge would eventually be used for video. Early video tape cartridge forms were mainly created for commercial use like Cartrivision and Video Cassette Recording. These would mainly be used TV stations and businesses that would rent out the systems to customers. While audio tape cartridges saw success, video tape cartridges did not as the technology was not as cheap to produce. Operating them were also cumbersome as the user had to make sure that the tape would be stopped before reaching a certain point as to not damage the tape cart and the amount of time it took for the tape to rewind all the way on the single reel was also to long for certain professional and home use. Eventually, video tape carts were phased out with the rise of videocassettes which made accessing the videotape easier and faster.

== Formats and products ==
=== Audio based ===
- Fidelipac
- 4-track cartridge
- 8-track cartridge
- Sanyo Micro Pack 35
- Cantata 700
- PlayTape
- HiPac

=== Video based ===
- Cartrivision
- Video Cassette Recording
- EIAJ-2

=== Computer Data ===
- Digital Linear Tape
- Linear Tape-Open
- IBM 3592

== See also ==
- List of tape cartridge and cassette formats
- Cassette (format)
- Audiotape
- Videotape
- Computer data storage
- Data proliferation
- Information repository
- Linear Tape-Open
- Magnetic storage
- Tape drive
- Tape mark
