= Trusonic =

Music company

Mood Media North America
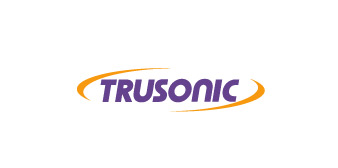
- Industry: Experiencial Design
- Headquarters: Austin, TX
- Website: us.moodmedia.com

Mood Media North America (formerly consisting of Muzak, LLC, DMX and Trusonic) is a commercial music company and a wholly owned subsidiary of Mood Media Corporation. Founded in 1999 as a small business unit (SBU) of the now defunct MP3.com, Trusonic provided background music to businesses. During the shutdown of MP3.com, Trusonic Inc, a new corporation co-founded by Joe Tebo and Dan O'Neill (the former VP of Engineering at MP3.com) purchased the assets (technology/IP/etc) of the Trusonic business unit including the rights to the majority of the MP3.com independent artist catalog. In October 2007 Trusonic Inc was acquired by Fluid Media Networks. Fluid Media Networks acquired Mood Media in 2010 and Trusonic Inc changed its name to Mood Media North America in 2011. The Trusonic brand remains as the name of the primary Technology Trusonic Media Player in use today.

During the shutdown of MP3.com, Trusonic's independent artists' musical recordings were at risk of deletion. As of January 2004, the independent artist catalog was composed of over 1.7 million sound recordings from more than 240,000 artists. The recently formed Trusonic Inc entered into an agreement with GarageBand.com, a website limited to independent artists, which allowed the content owners to authorize the transfer of songs from Trusonic Inc to GarageBand for public consumption. Mood Media North American continues to maintain this extensive music catalog under the name "Trusonic Independent Artists" via the Music Program Terms and Conditions license.

MP3.com's Trusonic business unit was the first to introduce an Internet-based business music player in July 1999, dubbed the MBOX. The MBOX requires an Internet connection (broadband or dial-up) to obtain music and schedules via its MSP protocol. The MBOX differentiates itself through an advanced music, messaging and daypart scheduling system known as Client Online Account (COA). The Trusonic system is a local aware event based playback device where each location is individually addressable and each location can have a unique schedule, or all locations within a retail chain can be scheduled identically. The COA programmed event lists are dynamically interpreted on each MBOX to generate the resulting stream of audio in the retail environment.

In 2017, due to years of losses, Mood Media re-structured its capital structure. The deal resulted in the takeover of the formerly public company by Apollo Global Management and GSO Capital Partners.

In July 2020, Mood Media filed for bankruptcy, with the COVID-19 pandemic a major reason for its financial problems. The company emerged from bankruptcy in less than 24 hours due to the agreement of all stakeholders, strong strategic plan, and stable team.
