= GarageBand.com =

Online community of independent musicians

GarageBand.com was a large online community of independent musicians and music fans, founded in 1999. The site was used by musicians who were seeking greater exposure and critical insight provided by an audience of their peers. The site was also used by music fans to discover new independent artists in the site's vast collection. Some music content was Creative Commons-licensed, as announced in 2004. GarageBand.com closed its doors in June 2010, offering users migration to iLike.

After the demise of the original MP3.com in 2003, subsidiary Trusonic, with an inventory of 250,000 artists representing 1.7 million songs, partnered with GarageBand.com in 2004 to revive these artist accounts. Most of the technology and infrastructure developed at MP3.com was retained.

== Main features ==
At the site's introduction in 1999, a monthly contest for a $250,000 record contract was announced. In addition to free MP3 hosting, GarageBand.com offered independent bands the chance to enter into contests in which they compete for a top spot on the GarageBand.com music charts for their particular musical genre (e.g. 'Rock', 'Avant Garde').

In 2005, the GarageBand Faceoff contest offered winners airplay during a weekday afternoon 4-minute broadcast on four large-market FM radio stations, and a grand prize Capitol Records recording contract at the end of the year. Later, the prize for hitting the top of the charts was expanded to inclusion in Clear Channel's "NEW! Discover Music" program, giving exposure across over 400 of the company's FM station websites. Entrance in the contest was either earned through reviewing the music of other members, or by paying a $19.99 per song submission fee.

The site uses a sophisticated rating system to generate popularity rankings for each artist, and maintains charts of these rankings. This makes the large music catalog easier to browse for fans. The music industry also uses these charts to find new talent. Several GarageBand.com members who have charted well found subsequent music career success in the form of label deals, licensing and promotional opportunities. Examples include 10 Years (signed to Universal Records) and American Idol finalist Bo Bice.

== Licensing and partnerships ==
In 2004, the company licensed the GarageBand name to Apple for use with its music creation software. Also that year, the company partnered with Microsoft for GarageBand members' music to be linked from MSN.com for download.

== Related products ==
GarageBand.com introduced Gcast, a podcasting platform which integrates the GarageBand.com digital music library, in 2005. The service was created in response to greatly increased traffic to GarageBand.com after its podcasting feature was introduced. It was announced to tie-in with World AIDS Day.

In 2006, the company launched iLike, a social music discovery website and iTunes sidebar application that tracks the music you listen to and recommends new music. Recommendations also include links to free downloads from GarageBand.com artists.

== History ==
The site was founded in 1999 by Jerry Harrison, Tom Zito and Amanda Welsh.

In February 2002, after the dot-com crash, the company lost an important record distribution deal. Later that month, the site owners took the website offline for a time, replacing it with a message explaining they did so in order to "preserve cash".

=== Evolution Artists Inc ===
In April 2002, a group of employees and site members formed a new corporation, Evolution Artists Inc, to acquire the site's assets. In May 2002, the site was restored and available again.

=== MP3.com archive ===
In April 2004, after the demise of the original MP3.com in December 2003, Trusonic (formerly an MP3.com division) partnered with GarageBand.com to revive "most" of the original MP3.com archive. An inventory of 250,000 artists representing 1.7 million songs. Using the name "MP3isBack.com", former MP3.com account holders were able recover their music from Trusonic and automatically transfer the music content to GarageBand.com. The MP3isBack.com site expired sometime between May and November 2005.

=== Microsoft ===
In 2006, Microsoft started sponsoring GarageBand.com.

=== Shut down ===
GarageBand.com closed its doors in June 2010, offering users migration to iLike.

As of 2013, the garageband.com domain is owned by Apple Inc. and redirects to the product page for their music software GarageBand.

== "The Final Countdown" (1999-2001) contest winners ==
The band's listed below were the winners of GarageBand.com's recurring but short-lived contest for a $250,000 recording contract.

- November 1999: Boondogs
- February 2000: Monovox
- April 2000: Headboard
- June 2000: Ultraphonic
- August 2000: MichelleCross
- October 2000: Mercy River
- December 2000: Sunfall Festival ("I Walked Away")
- March 2001: Brilliant
- June 2001: Caser ("Don't Mind")
- August 2001: the Szuters ("Antichrist Theme")

== Reviewers' Picks awards ==
To win a Reviewers' Pick award, a band must show growth on the Independent Music Charts by genre, high review ratings and maintain an active profile. Artist were reviewed and awarded weekly.

== Reception ==
In December 2003, Business Wire praised GarageBand.com for being the world's "largest online community of independent musicians", and "largest source of legal free music".

In a 2006 review in PC Magazine the site received an "Excellent" editor rating, with 4 (of 5) stars. Bill Machrone summarized, "GarageBand.com demands a lot of work, in the form of music reviews, from participants. But this community of half a million artists and listeners may just be the Web's best source of indie music."
