= PlayNetwork =

PlayNetwork, Inc.
- Company type: Private
- Industry: Marketing and Entertainment Media
- Founded: Seattle, WA, United States (1996)
- Headquarters: Redmond, WA
- Key people: Ross Honey, CEO Tony Plesner, CFO; Quentin Gallet, CTO; Marc Felsen, CMO; Pam Shoenfeld, SVP, General Counsel; Luke Ferro, EVP, North American Sales Evan LaVere, SVP, Music and Systems
- Products: Music for Business Digital Signage; Audio/Video Systems; Licensed Music Distribution; Brand Development; Music Supervision; Original Video Production; Innovation; SiriusXM; Messaging; Advertising Networks; Systems Advantage
- Number of employees: 235
- Parent: Mood Media
- Website: http://www.playnetwork.com

PlayNetwork, Inc. is a provider of in-store music and entertainment for retail, restaurant, and hospitality environments. In September 2021, four years after merging with the company, TouchTunes sold PlayNetwork to Mood Media.

== History ==
The company was founded by Kevin Robell in 1996. As a music programmer for the Tom Selleck-owned nightclub Black Orchid in Honolulu, HI during the 80s, Kevin noticed "the synergetic relationship between customers, music, and their environment"; He went on to establish PlayNetwork in Seattle with brother Gordon Robell as a digital music provider for businesses.

In 1996, Adam Brotman, who was a consultant to Kevin Robell, became CEO. Adam went on to become Starbucks’ Chief Digital Officer in 2009.

In 1998, PlayNetwork began a partnership with Starbucks to provide digital music systems and service to over 1,800 retail locations in North America. By 2001, the company was providing services to more than 3,500 international locations.

In 2003, PlayNetwork is named one of the Inc. 500 Fastest Growing Private Companies.

In 2005, Executive Chairman of the Board, Lon Troxel is appointed as CEO. PlayNetwork acquires Crows Nest Entertainment (digital signage and advertising). PlayNetwork is named one of the Deloitte Technology Fast 500.

In 2009, PlayNetwork acquires custom in-store television network developer Channel M.

In 2013, offices in London and Hong Kong open.

In May 2017, PlayNetwork merged with TouchTunes Interactive Network and the combined company's headquarters was reported to be located at New York City and Seattle.

=== International expansion ===
PlayNetwork continues to expand internationally with the opening of office locations in London and Hong Kong, with an additional office in Santiago, Chile in 2014.
