= Killing of Timothy Russell and Malissa Williams =

2012 Cleveland police killing of two Black people

Shooting of Timothy Russell and Malissa Williams
- Date: November 29, 2012
- Time: c. 11:24 p.m.
- Location: Cleveland and East Cleveland, Ohio, United States
- Participants: Timothy Russell and Malissa Williams (fatalities); Michael Brelo and 12 others (police officers)
- Deaths: Timothy Russell and Malissa Williams (November 29, 2012)
- Suspects: Michael Brelo
- Charges: Two counts of voluntary manslaughter Two counts of felonious assault
- Verdict: Not guilty
- Litigation: Families of Russell and Williams filed a lawsuit against the city of Cleveland, received $3 million

The shooting deaths of Timothy Russell and Malissa Williams, two Black American individuals, occurred in East Cleveland, Ohio on November 29, 2012, when the sound of vehicle's exhaust backfiring caused police to erroneously claim shots were fired at them as Russell and Williams drove by. A 22-minute police chase which started in downtown Cleveland, involving over 60 officers over 23-miles ended in Russell and Williams being shot over 20 times each and killed in their car inside a parking lot of a middle school.

Thirteen police officers surrounding the vehicle fired at Russell and Williams, who were unarmed, over 137 times. In May 2014, one of the officers involved, Michael Brelo, was charged with two counts of voluntary manslaughter, and was acquitted by a Cuyahoga County judge of the charges on May 23, 2015.

Five police supervisors were also charged with dereliction of duty, a misdemeanor. Their trial was set on July 27, 2015, went through various delays, with prosecutors dismissing all charges against three of the supervising officers in January 2019 while a fourth police supervisor was found not guilty in July 2019. The trial's verdict resulted in small-scale riots in Cleveland, resulting in 74 arrests.

On January 26, 2016, it was reported that six Cleveland police officers were fired due to their connection with the car chase. Five of the six officers were reinstated in October 2017 as required by the ruling of an arbitrator.

The families of Russell and Williams filed a lawsuit against the city of Cleveland, and received a settlement of US$3 million (equivalent to $4.1 million in 2025) in November 2014.

== Backgrounds ==
=== Michael Brelo ===
Michael Brelo (born 1983–84) is an Iraq War USMC veteran. When he returned home, he became a correctional officer in Bedford Heights, Ohio. He then joined the Cleveland Police Department in 2007.

=== Timothy Russell and Malissa Williams ===
Russell (aged 43) had met Williams (aged 30) at the Bishop Cosgrove Center, where they both received free meals. He was living at the Metropolitan Ministry Center prior to his death.

Malissa Williams lived at the Norma Herr's Women Center on Payne Avenue in Cleveland.

== Shooting ==
Russell was driving his 1979 light-blue Chevrolet Malibu and Williams was seated in the passenger seat. A plainclothes police officer spotted Russell's car in an area known for drug deals. The officer checked the license plate which uncovered nothing notable. He then pulled the car over for a turn signal violation. Russell pulled over, but the car was not searched and the officer let them go. There is camera footage showing both cars pull off. Russell proceeded to speed by two officers, they believed that they heard shots being fired. As no firearm was found in the vehicle, the sound was determined to have been caused by the car backfiring.

According to The Plain Dealer, the chase went up to speeds of 100 mph and a total of 62 police cars were involved at one point. Officers from Cleveland, East Cleveland, Bratenahl, the Cuyahoga County Sheriff's Department, the Ohio State Highway Patrol, and the Greater Cleveland Regional Transit Authority participated in the chase.

After a 22-mile chase, Russell turned into Heritage Middle School, located in East Cleveland. Police officers later said they believed they saw a firearm in the car and that Russell was planning on running them over. One officer subsequently opened fire, followed by others, killing both occupants. In the end, thirteen officers fired a total of 137 bullets into the car, with Officer Michael Brelo firing 49 of those shots. Russell was struck 23 times, and Williams was struck 24 times. No weapons were recovered from the vehicle.

== Legal proceedings ==
On May 30, 2014, only one officer of the thirteen who fired at the car, Michael Brelo, was indicted on two counts of voluntary manslaughter in connection with the shooting. He was the only officer who continued to shoot even after the others stopped firing and was said to have actually moved forward and jumped onto the hood of Russel's car, after which he reportedly shot approximately fifteen rounds. The two counts of voluntary manslaughter carried a maximum penalty of 22 years of prison if convicted. Five police supervisors were also indicted for dereliction of duty. According to Cuyahoga County prosecutors, Brelo stood on the hood of Russell and Williams' car and fired straight down at them through their windshield after the twelve other officers stopped firing. Prosecutors said that the actions were unreasonable and went past his duties as a police officer.

On May 23, 2015, Cuyahoga Common Pleas Judge John P. O'Donnell found Brelo not guilty of the charges. O'Donnell stated that while Brelo fired lethal shots at Russell and Williams, other officers did as well. O'Donnell also found Brelo not guilty of a lesser included charge of felonious assault, asserting that Brelo was legally justified in his use of deadly force. O'Donnell referred to 10 pages of his 35-page verdict in court, referring to the prosecution's criminal burden of proof, to prove all elements of the offence beyond a reasonable doubt.

On June 3, 2015, it was announced that an arrest warrant was filed against Brelo for an alleged assault on his twin brother, Mark R. Brelo, on May 27, in Bay Village, Ohio. The brothers turned themselves in on June 3, after Brelo's intoxicated brother had run to a neighbor's home to ask them to call 911 on his brother, Michael Brelo, by whom he was being chased and allegedly assaulted. They were released on their own recognizance.

On January 26, 2016, the six officers (Wilfredo Diaz, Brian Sabolik, Erin O'Donnell, Michael Farley, Chris Ereg and Michael Brelo) were fired from their jobs at the Cleveland Police. The Cleveland Police Patrolmen's Association said that they would work to get the six reinstated to their positions. Five of the six officers were reinstated in October 2017 as required by the ruling of an arbitrator.

=== Federal investigation ===
The U.S. Department of Justice announced on May 24, 2015, that they would open an investigation in the deaths of Russell and Williams, and would review the testimony and evidence presented at Brelo's trial. This investigation was closed in January 2017.

=== Trial on dereliction charge ===
Trial for the five police officers that Cuyahoga County charged with misdemeanor dereliction of duty was set for July 27, 2015. On July 2, 2015, the East Cleveland prosecutor filed its own dereliction of duty charges against the same five officers, and the County dismissed its charges on July 24, 2015. The officers objected to moving the trial to East Cleveland, and appealed the dismissal. In May 2016, an Ohio appeals court held that the dismissal was improper, but in April 2017, the Ohio Supreme Court reversed and left it up to the trial court judge, William Dawson, to decide where the trial would go forward. By October 2017, Judge Dawson had not yet put the case on the docket.

In March 2018, two defense attorneys reported that prosecutors had offered to drop all charges against the officers if they paid fines of $5,000 each. They declined the offer. On March 22, 2018, prosecutors filed a formal motion asking the court to set a trial date. All five officers pleaded not guilty. In July 2018, the defendants asked the court to dismiss the charges, arguing that the more than 5½ years that had passed since the 2012 shooting violated their constitutional right to a speedy trial. The court denied the motion on September 20; the defense attorneys announced their intent to appeal this ruling.

In January 2019, the prosecutors dismissed all charges against three of the five supervising officers.

In July 2019, the case concluded with the police supervisor in charge of the officers involved in the '137 shots' case not guilty. East Cleveland Municipal Court confirmed Sgt. Patricia Coleman not guilty after a 3-day long trial, ending a year-long battle. The Cleveland Division of Police continues to receive criticism from the public about the misdemeanor, claiming the actions were due to racism, as both fatalities were African-American. Only one member of the division, Officer Michael Brelo, was charged after the incident. Brelo fired 49 of the shots but was not found guilty of voluntary manslaughter. Brelo was the only officer to lose his job following the shooting.

== Protests ==
After Brelo was acquitted, violent protests and unrest ensued in downtown Cleveland, which led to the arrests of at least 71 people as of May 25. Among those arrested were charged with felonious assault, rioting, and failure to disperse. At least 15 people were apprehended by riot police officers. The deaths of Russell and Williams were two of several killings of unarmed African Americans protested by the Black Lives Matter movement.

== Lawsuit ==
The families of Russell and Williams filed a lawsuit against the city of Cleveland, claiming they were liable for the wrongful deaths of the two. In November 2014, Cleveland paid US$3 million (equivalent to $4.1 million in 2025) to the two families, which was split evenly.

== Documentary ==
In 2021, Netflix released the documentary 137 Shots about the shooting.

== See also ==
- List of unarmed African Americans killed by law enforcement officers in the United States
