= DMX (music service) =

Branding agency and digital music service

DMX, Inc.
- Type: Private
- Industry: Music
- Founded: 1971
- Headquarters: Austin, Texas, United States
- Key people: John Cullen, CEO and Paul Stone, president
- Products: Music, video, messaging, scent, interactive media and promotions, A/V systems for commercial environments
- Parent: Mood Media
- Website: www.dmx.com

DMX, Inc., formerly Audio Environments, Inc., and later AEI Music Network, Inc., is a "multi-sensory" branding agency based in Austin, Texas. DMX also provides music for cable and satellite television networks worldwide, including DStv in Africa. It was the first company to provide music by satellite.

It has been part of Mood Media since around 2012.

== History ==
In 1971 Audio Environments, Inc. was founded in Seattle as a music service to license and program original artist music for businesses. Customers did not want to hear the commercials on radio programs, and by the 1970s Muzak was out of favor. AEI's music programs were provided on broadcast cartridges which played continuously. In the 1980s, the company began providing services to international airlines, dental offices and residential and cable television systems. In the mid-'80s tape distribution was replaced with direct satellite broadcasting.

In 1990 International Cablecasting Technologies Inc. launched the service called CD/18, a reference to "the equivalent of 18 CD-players", which offered digital music through the coaxial cable. It soon changed its name to DMX (Digital Music Express). It was broadcast on a KU sideband; the space between already existing cable channels was used to deliver the music, so the service didn't require any extra space from the cable companies. In 1993 the subscriber costs were $10.95 per month. By mid 1994 DMX had 350,000 households subscribing. It came with a remote control that allowed the user to see the name of the song, artist and album.

In 2001, AEI merged with Liberty Digital Inc. of Los Angeles in a deal that gave Liberty 56 percent and AEI 44 percent of the merged company known as DMX/AEI Music. AEI had large national customers into international markets, while DMX had dealt with smaller businesses. DMX also served residential cable television subscribers working on streaming over the Internet.

The company's on-site digital system known as "ProFusion" was launched in 2002 to deliver and play back high-quality digital music to places around the world. In 2005, DMX was purchased by Capstar Partners which then officially changed the name to DMX, Inc. In the same year, the "ProFusion M5", its first digital platform that controls both video and music content, was launched. Most recently, the company began offering scent marketing as another service for customers.

Loral Skynet announced on June 21, 2001, that DMX/AEI would switch from its Telstar 4 to Telstar 8 in 2002.

In 2007, DMX applied to merge with a Fort Mill, South Carolina, competitor, Muzak Holdings LLC, with the resultant combined entity sold to a third-party buyer. Reportedly, Mood Media of Canada had been heavily courted since the beginning, but the combination of the United States Department of Justice's second request for information on the merger, and the bankruptcy filing by Muzak disrupted that original merger. Instead, on Thursday, March 24, 2011, Mood Media itself announced that it would be buying Muzak in a $345 million deal, and then a year later also announced its acquisition of the original DMX company which had courted them three years earlier on March 19, 2012, in a deal valued at $86.1 million .

In July 2020, Mood Media filed for bankruptcy, with the COVID-19 pandemic a major reason for its financial problems. The company emerged from bankruptcy in less than 24 hours after stakeholders reached agreement.

== SonicTap ==
From February 9, 2010, to February 10, 2018, DMX (Music) provided over 84 commercial-free audio-only music channels to DirecTV customers, branded as "SonicTap". DirecTV dropped SonicTap in favor of Music Choice on February 10, 2018.
