= Music Choice =

American music television service

- Country: United States
- Headquarters: Horsham, Pennsylvania

Programming
- Languages: English; Multilingual (some genres)
- Picture format: 480i/1080p (Video on demand), 480p (EDTV)

Ownership
- Owner: Music Choice LLC; Arris; Charter Communications; Comcast; Cox Communications; Microsoft; Sony Corporation of America

History
- Launched: 1987 (38 years ago)
- Former names: Digital Cable Radio

Links
- Website: www.musicchoice.com

Music Choice (abbreviated as MC) is an American television music service that digitally broadcasts audio-based music channels and video-related content to cable television providers in the United States. In 2016, it reached 72 million households in North America via linear television channels and TV-on-demand services.

Music Choice is distributed nationwide by Xfinity, Spectrum, Cox Communications, Verizon Fios, DirecTV, and other smaller cable providers. Similar broadcast music services include DMX, Stingray Music (Canada-based), SiriusXM, and XITE (Europe-based).

== History ==
=== Early development ===
Music Choice (formerly known as Digital Cable Radio) was the first digital audio broadcast service in the world and, under its founder and CEO David Del Beccaro, launched in test markets circa 1987. From its inception as an eight-channel audio service from Motorola's cable group, Music Choice evolved into a multi-platform, interactive music network based in New York that reaches millions of consumers nationwide. Music Choice is a partnership owned by a consortium including Universal's Comcast, Charter Communications (through its acquisition of Time Warner Cable in May 2016), Cox Communications, EMI, Microsoft, Arris International (formerly part of Motorola's cable technologies division), and Sony Corporation of America.

Several of its radio stations are measured through Mediabase and its playlists are accounted for in weekly airplay charts in addition to traditional radio and SiriusXM plays.

Before the major graphic change in November 2021, Music Choice used color-coded themes behind or on text elements that vary by daypart, with schemes such as blue, pink, green, or yellow.

In 2021, these Music Choice channels had a photo slideshow, that still changes the picture every thirty seconds appearing on-screen as the music plays, and the music artist, song and album from top or bottom/up or down.

Around October 18, 2024, element corners were rounded, and the typeface of major elements besides advertisements which are based on images, was changed to Poppins, as opposed to the November 2021 typeface being Graphik Compact.

== Platforms ==
=== Linear audio channels ===
Music Choice currently offers over 140 linear channels of various music radio formats through digital cable providers. The number of channels available varies by provider. It adds several genres such as R&B, techno, hip-hop, jazz, blues, folk, country, rock, seasonal, and faith-based music across various decades.

=== Music Choice On Demand ===
Music Choice offers free video on demand content with most cable TV packages, including hundreds of channels and playlists.

=== TV Everywhere App ===
In July 2008, Music Choice released the Music Choice TV Everywhere app for iOS and Android. The app requires login with a participating provider's TV Everywhere authentication credentials to use, and the same access is available on traditional computer web browsers.

In March 2026, Music Choice introduced the ETV look to the webplayer, allowing the same features from the mobile and TV app to be used on any web browser.

Each Music Choice channel is distributed in a freeze frame television format, where still slides appear on screen while the audio plays. These slides typically display banner advertising (which is the only form of advertising shown on the service) and "Did You Know?" factoids which contained various pieces of music trivia. These on-screen trivia factoids have drawn criticism for occasionally presenting harsh or morbid content. A May 2017 HuffPost article highlights that some slides featured details about illness, homicide, and suicide involving musical artists and their close relations, describing the tone as abnormally dark for a music platform.

=== SWRV ===
In February 2010, Music Choice launched SWRV (pronounced 'swerve'), a 24-hour interactive music video digital cable channel. The network struggled to gain momentum and was eventually rebranded to Music Choice Play on October 15, 2013. Music Choice Play was phased out by 2016.

=== Subscription services ===
By 2021, Music Choice offered various subscription services available through the extended, online-connected services of cable set-top boxes. In May 2026, the add-on subscription services were exclusive to Xfinity, Cox Communications, and Charter Communications customers through video on demand. However, the add-ons are being discontinued to create a free video experience, with video channels taking place of the add-on contents. Despite stating they are developing the video experience for "in the coming months," several video channels are already available, such as birds, nature sounds, colors of noise, and seasonal soundscapes.

==== Music Choice Karaoke ====
A household karaoke service providing access to instrumental versions of popular songs arranged into playlists with sing-along lyrics.

==== Music Choice Relax ====
A service providing calming soundscapes and soothing nature imagery for the purposes of relaxation.

==== Music Choice+ ====
A service exclusive to Xfinity and Cox Communications providing immediate access to any song or album in the Music Choice library, along with playlist creation, device downloads, and song skipping abilities. As of April 29, 2025, Music Choice Plus has been shut down.

==== Music Choice Lo-Fi ====
A service providing lo-fi music for studying and relaxing.

== Legal issues ==
=== Stingray ===
In June 2016, Music Choice filed a lawsuit against Canada-based Stingray over patent infringement. The lawsuit occurred one month following the announcement that Comcast, partial owner of Music Choice, had chosen instead to offer Stingray Radio.

Music Choice drew criticism with the lawsuit; Stingray responded:

"Given the significant inroads that Stingray has made in the U.S. market [Comcast expansion] with its industry-changing technology, Stingray believes that Music Choice’s complaint is without merit and primarily motivated by competitive concerns rather than a desire to protect its intellectual property."

Music Choice's lawsuit against Stingray disputed four U.S. Patents pertaining to the formatting of Stingray Digital's music channels. On August 29, 2016, Stingray counter-sued Music Choice calling the patent lawsuit a "smear campaign".

=== Music Modernization Act opposition ===
In 2018, A2IM CEO Richard James Burgess accused Music Choice of trying to solicit group/artist and label support to deceive Congress into reducing groups/artists' royalties paid by Music Choice. The criticism came as Music Choice publicly opposed the passage of the Music Modernization Act, which eventually was signed into law on October 11, 2018.

=== SoundExchange ===
On April 10, 2019, SoundExchange filed a lawsuit against Music Choice for underpayment, following an audit of Music Choice's royalty statements.

== See also ==
- Litt Live
- DMX (music service)
- Muzak
- SiriusXM
- Stingray Radio
- Xite
