= TouchTunes =

Social jukebox and entertainment company

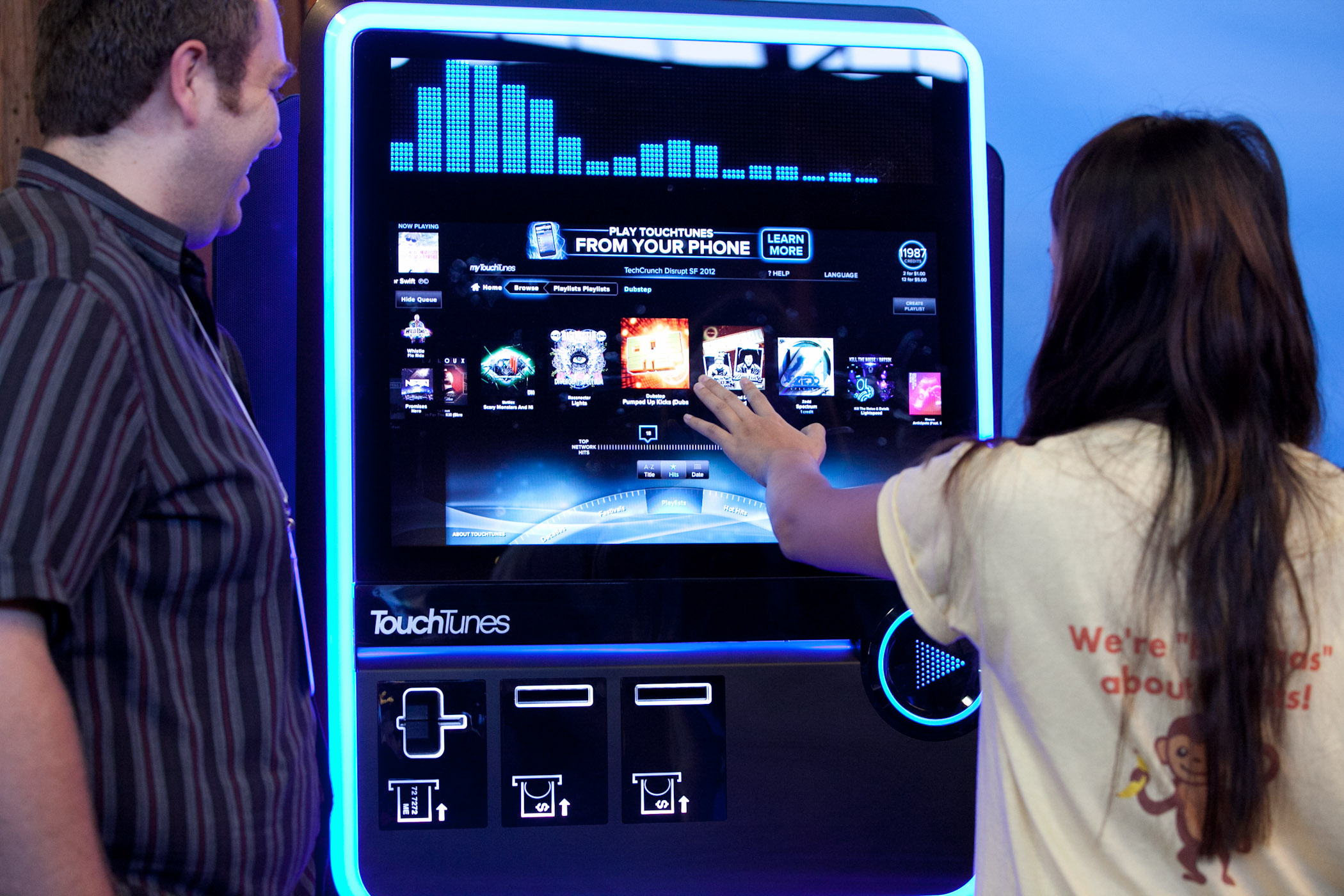
- A demonstration of TouchTunes digital jukebox in 2012
- Company type: Private
- Industry: Digital/social jukebox, Entertainment
- Founded: 1998
- Headquarters: New York City, United States
- Key people: Scott Levine (CEO)
- Website: TouchTunes

TouchTunes is a social jukebox and entertainment company that provides interactive music system in bars, restaurants, and other social venues. Founded in 1998, the company makes digital music systems that allow users to select and play songs through touchscreen interfaces and mobile applications.

== Overview ==
TouchTunes operates a network of over 65,000 digital jukeboxes across North America and Europe. Users can browse music libraries, create playlists, and control playback using the TouchTunes mobile app, available on iOS and Android. The platform integrates social and gamification features.

== PlayNetwork 2017 - 2021 ==
In May 2017, TouchTunes Interactive Network merged with PlayNetwork and the combined company's headquarters was reported to be located at New York City and Seattle.

In September 2021, rival retail music distributor Mood Media acquired PlayNetwork from TouchTunes.

== TouchTunes chart ==
Billboard maintained a weekly chart of tracks played on TouchTunes machines until 2003.

TouchTunes now publishes its own airplay charts.

== Patent dispute with Ecast, Inc. ==
In late 2001, Ecast, Inc. filed a lawsuit against TouchTunes Music Corporation claiming the company resorted to unfair trade practices by notifying Ecast and its customers that they were infringing TouchTunes' patent.

In 2003, the two companies became embroiled in a series of patent infringement lawsuits. The disputes centered around allegations of unauthorized use of proprietary technologies related to digital jukebox systems.

By April 2004, the two companies reached a settlement, agreeing to cross-license their respective technologies.

== Recent developments (2024-2025) ==
In July 2024, TouchTunes announced a partnership with Lucra, a software company specializing in social competition platforms. This collaboration aims to integrate Lucra's software into the TouchTunes FunWallet, enabling users to engage in friendly wagers and track scores directly through the TouchTunes app.

On November 27, 2024, TouchTunes commemorated National Jukebox Day by highlighting the evolution of jukeboxes from classic vinyl players to modern digital interfaces, emphasizing their enduring presence in social venues.

In December 2024, TouchTunes released its Year-End Charts, showcasing the most-played artists and songs across its network. Jelly Roll was honored as Artist of the Year, while Shaboozey's "A Bar Song (Tipsy)" earned the title of Song of the Year. Additionally, Metallica was recognized as the National Jukebox Day Ambassador.

In early 2025, TouchTunes reported a substantial increase in app-generated revenue, attributing this growth to recent enhancements in their mobile application.

In February 2025, TouchTunes garnered media attention when Tennessee Volunteers fans used the app to remotely play their fight song, "Rocky Top", in Ohio State bars ahead of a college football playoff game.

== Features ==
- Digital jukeboxes with touchscreen interfaces
- Mobile app for song selection and remote control
- Personalized music recommendations
- Integration with loyalty programs and promotions
- Karaoke and interactive gaming experiences

== Technology ==
TouchTunes jukeboxes use cloud-based systems to update music selections and provide real-time analytics for venue owners. The company partners with record labels and rights organizations to ensure licensed music distribution.

== See also ==
- Music streaming services
