= Monovox =

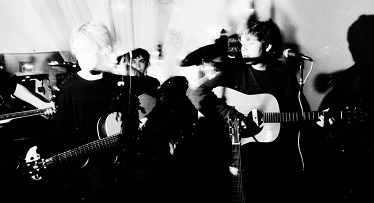
Monovox playing live

Monovox was an American rock band. In 1992, four band members – Matthew Schaeffer, Cliff Hammer, Matthew Kramer and Tony Krug – started writing and performing songs while they were still in high school. They graduated and went their separate ways for a while until moving to Madison, Wisconsin, in 1995. In 1997 while performing at Chicago's Beatlefest, they were discovered by Chicago record producer Joey Donatello. He developed the band and got their first album, Burlap and Broadcast, released in 1997. Their career and time together were short lived.

== Early history ==
Beginning in 1992, Fond du Lac, Wisconsin, high school classmates Matthew Schaeffer, Cliff Hammer, and Tony Krug (a.k.a. Anthony) began writing and performing songs together. Under the moniker J.J. War, the band wrote and performed original songs. In 1994 after graduating high school, Schaeffer moved to Madison to study piano performance and composition at the University of Wisconsin, under Professor Carrol Chilton. Hammer and Krug remained in Fond du Lac. The band members all moved to Madison the following year, living together and writing songs.

In 1997, they traveled to Chicago to perform in the city's annual BeatleFest. The resulting publicity brought the band to the attention of Chicago record producer Joey "The Don" Donatello, who developed the band and was responsible for their first album, Burlap and Broadcast, released in 1997. The band then relocated to Chicago to gain wider exposure in the local club scene.

== Big break and subsequent parting ==
In 2000, Monovox earned a $250,000 recording contract through the internet record label GarageBand.com. The highest user-rated song out of thousands of recordings submitted to the Garageband.com website, "First Time" (which was penned by Schaeffer and later lyricized by Shaw) was soon re-recorded in Sausalito, California, with Jerry Harrison as producer. This song, along with twelve additional tracks that the band would record, would become the group's first and only full-length album as Monovox. Garageband dissolved with the dot-com bust of 2001, and the self-titled album was not released until much later, under the band's own "Ask A Chimp" label.

In the years that followed, Schaeffer continued writing, touring, and recording songs with the band until March 2004, when Schaeffer and fellow Monovox guitarist Paulie Heenan (who had joined the group in 2001) announced that they were leaving the band to move to Manhattan, so that they might pursue music careers there. Kramer remained in Madison, working at DNA Studios as a producer. Hammer now performs with several Madison-area bands, and Shaw has occasionally and acoustically performed solo in Madison. Shaw graduated from the University of Wisconsin-Madison with a BA during the spring of 2004.

== Death ==
Paulie Heenan died on November 9, 2012, in Madison, at the age of 30. He was shot by police during an altercation after apparently being mistaken for a burglar after a night of drinking and entering the wrong house by mistake.

== Discography ==
- Burlap and Broadcast (1997)
- Monovox (EP) (2003)
- Sausalito (2004)
