= Mood Media =

American out-of-home marketing company

- Formerly: Muzak; DMX; Trusonic; South Central A\V
- Industry: Marketing; Entertainment; Experience Design
- Headquarters: Austin, Texas
- Area served: Worldwide
- Key people: CEO Roy Kosuge
- Services: Business Music; Digital Signage; Scent Marketing; Interactive Audiovisual
- Owner: Vector Capital
- Divisions: Technomedia Solutions
- Subsidiaries: GoConvergence
- Website: www.moodmedia.com

Mood Media Corporation is an international in-store provider of music, digital signage, hold music, on-hold messaging, scent, integrated audio/video, and interactive mobile marketing products. It was founded in 2004, and is based in Austin, Texas. The company provides services to a variety of retailers and other business verticals such as restaurant, financial, healthcare, hospitality and QSR. Mood Media Corporation has expanded its product offerings through acquisitions of Somerset Entertainment in Canada, BIS Group in Europe, and Trusonic, AEI Music Network Inc., Muzak, DMX, Technomedia, and GoConvergence in the United States.

Roy Kosuge is the CEO of Mood Media Corporation.

== Company history ==
Mood Media Corporation was founded in 2004, as Fluid Music Canada. It held an initial public offering in June 2008 on the Toronto Stock Exchange. The company offered stock at $2 per share, which subsequently raised $27 million. The company rebranded itself as Mood Media in June 2010, after taking over Europe-based Mood Media Group SA. The company was traded on the Canadian, and European stock exchanges, although it has since been delisted.

The company has made a number of acquisitions over the years, expanding its presence across Europe, North America, Asia, Latin America and Australia. According to internal reports, the company reaches 100 million people in 500,000 commercial locations in over 40 countries.

In 2017, due to years of losses, the company re-structured its capital structure. The deal resulted in the takeover of the formerly public company by Apollo Global Management and GSO Capital Partners.

In October 2017, ARN launched iHeartRadio for business, powered by Mood Media.

In July 2020, Mood Media filed for bankruptcy, with the COVID-19 pandemic being a major reason for its financial problems. The company emerged from bankruptcy in less than 24 hours due to the agreement of all stakeholders, a strong strategic plan, and a stable team.

== Acquisitions ==
=== Trusonic ===
Fluid Music Canada, Inc. acquired Trusonic Inc. of La Jolla, California on October 17, 2007. Founded in 1999, Trusonic provided commercial music services to companies, and they broadcast over 80 million songs monthly through their proprietary music network. During this period, Mark Elfenbein was the president of Trusonic which became known as Mood Media North America

=== Somerset Entertainment ===
Fluid Music Canada, Inc. announced the completion of its acquisition of Somerset Entertainment on November 25, 2009. The acquisition valued Somerset Entertainment at $53.1 million. Somerset is a producer and distributor of recorded music sold through non-traditional retailers. The company has a network of over 28,000 interactive kiosks that allow customers to preview CDs in 18,500 locations in more than 20 countries. In 2007, Somerset sold over 16 million records and recorded revenue of $90.6 million and an EBITDA of $20.5 million. Somerset employs over 180 employees and has offices in Toronto, Ontario, Buffalo Grove, Illinois, Minneapolis, Minnesota, and Essex, United Kingdom.

=== Muzak ===
In March 2011, Mood Media acquired the American background music company Muzak Holdings for a reported $345 million. As the leading commercial sound provider in North America, Muzak distributes music for in-store marketing inside shopping malls, restaurants, and dental offices. In the US alone, Muzak provides background music for more than 300,000 locations, either directly or through a franchise operation. The company had filed for bankruptcy in 2009 and had completed a restructuring prior Mood Media's acquisition. Revenue for fiscal year 2010 was $195 million. In October 2012, Muzak acquired the assets of one of its major franchisees (Independence Communications Inc.) in the mid-Atlantic region of the United States.

=== DMX ===
In March 2012, Mood Media announced the acquisition of DMX and its subsidiary AEI Music Network Inc. The deal was valued at $86.1 million. DMX, a US provider of multi-sensory branding services, uses music, video, and digital signage, scent, and audio/visual systems to create branded connections with customers that encourage loyalty. The company has provided its services to large-scale clients, including Gold's Gym, McDonald's, Burberry, and Whole Foods Market. In April 2014, Stingray Digital Group acquired the Canadian assets of DMX Music Inc. from Mood Media for $11.2 million.

=== BIS Group ===
In June 2012, Mood Media acquired BIS Group, a company specializing in audio-visual installations for corporate and commercial clients. Operating in Belgium, Luxembourg and the Netherlands, this acquisition extends Mood Media's reach into Europe. The deal consisted of a 22.5 million Euro cash buyout.

=== Technomedia and GoConvergence ===
Mood Media acquired Technomedia, along with its sister company, GoConvergence, in December 2012 for $23 million. Based in Orlando, Florida, Technomedia provides audio-visual and interactive media for retail outlets, theme parks, museums, restaurants and corporate settings. Principal clients include Abercrombie & Fitch, the Hard Rock Café, and Cirque du Soleil.

=== South Central A\V ===
In June 2019, Mood Media acquired the assets of South Central A\V for an undisclosed sum. As the largest independent affiliate of Mood Media with a history dating back to 1946, Nashville-based South Central A\V provides Mood Media products in addition to a variety of high-end audiovisual systems integration services to clients throughout Alabama, Arkansas, Florida, Illinois, Indiana, Iowa, Kentucky, Nevada, North Dakota, South Dakota and Tennessee.

=== PlayNetwork ===
In September 2021, Mood Media acquired PlayNetwork from its rival retail music distributor TouchTunes.

== Business model ==
Through its various subsidiaries, Mood Media provides audio, visual, multimedia and scent marketing products to specialty retailers, department stores, supermarkets, financial institutions, and fitness clubs.
