= Cantata 700 =

Background music system and tape format

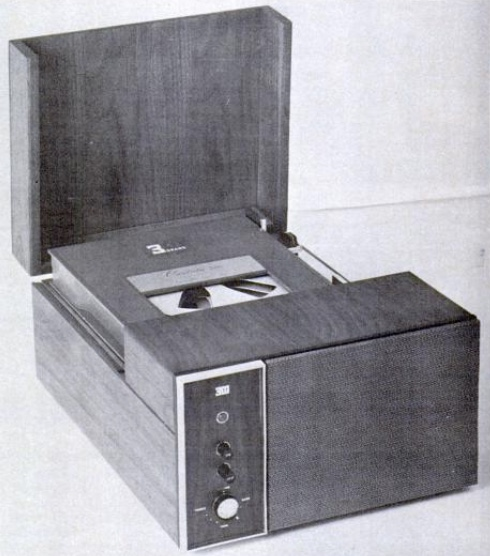
- Media type: Magnetic tape cartridge
- Encoding: Analog signal, in four mono tracks @ 1 7/8 in (48 mm) IPS
- Capacity: 26 hours
- Read mechanism: Tape head
- Write mechanism: Prerecorded only
- Developed by: 3M
- Usage: Audio storage for background music
- Released: 1965; 61 years ago
- Discontinued: 1988

The Cantata 700 is a commercial background music system and corresponding tape cartridge format developed by 3M that was in common use from 1965 until the 1990s.

== Cartridge ==
The nearly square-shaped cartridges are among the largest built. More than 24 hours of playback fits on a cartridge. The music distributed by 3M consisted of mono recordings some of which are attributed to the company's "3M Orchestra", with later editions featuring a themed blend of library music tracks and mostly instrumental cover versions of standard songs, and classical pieces arranged in a light or bright tempo. Cartridges such as the Italian and Polynesian editions include some vocal content. The tape is 1/4 in (6.4 mm) wide and is played at 1 7/8 in (48 mm) per second. The cartridge consists of a reel-to-reel mechanism intended for playback only. Internally, the cartridge contains two 8 3/8 in (210 mm) tape reels, tape guides, rollers, and a reel brake. The reels are stacked on top of each other vertically and counter rotate during operation. After passing over the tape head, the tape loops over a roller in the cartridge to change its direction back to the takeup reel.

There were three main designs of cartridges manufactured, with a fourth minor modification. The earlier tapes (1965-mid 70s) use metal reels and the later tapes use plastic reels (mid 70s-1988). Muzak acquired the remaining unsold stock in 1986. Tapes manufactured before 1986 use Scotch recording tape inside. Tapes sold by Muzak use a different formulation of tape more similar to type 1 cassette tape. Muzak tapes use 3M shells with Muzak labels over the top of the 3M labeling. The last tapes were sold in 1988. All information on the Cantata 700 was divested by 3M in 1988.

== Machines ==
All offered machines are playback only. The first models 94BG and 94BZ, were offered in 1965 and bundled with two cartridges of the customer's choice for US$429.00; equivalent to $4,383 in 2025. Each machine is equipped with a jack for 8 Ω speakers at a maximum of 6 W and a microphone jack for public address announcements.

The machines played continuously using an auto-reverse mechanism. As the tape reaches one end, the reverse mechanism activates and changes the drive direction. The tape head moves to the other side and the mechanism shifts pinch rollers. The design does not require the head to turn over; instead, the entire head changes position to play the tape at the other side of the tape path.

In 1970, 3M introduced the Cantata 700 Mark II, available only by lease.

== Variety of Cartridges ==
- Easy Listening IRL-SO8
- Variety Library V-168
- Rhythmic Library R-165
- Melodic Library 165
- Rhythmic Library Series II 266
- International Rhythmic Uptempo IR-169
- Polynesian Library P-166
- Fiesta Library F-807
- Rhapsody RH-185
- Rhapsody RH-295
- Bright & Lively BL-707
- Elegance EL-236
- Modified Rock Library 170
- Christmas Choral Library VX-167
- Christmas Rhythmic Library RX-266
- Christmas Melodic Library 165
- Contempo Library C-300
- Cavalcade CA-264
- Nashville NA-288
- Americana AM-76
- Smooth Reflections SR-419
- Uptempo U-825
- American Country A-169
- Zodiac Z-025
- Smooth & Easy SE-526
- Latin American Rhythmic Library LL-166
- Italian Library SI-200
- International Melodic IM-470
- French FG-622
- Big Band BB-630
