= Fidelipac =

Magnetic tape sound recording format used in broadcasting

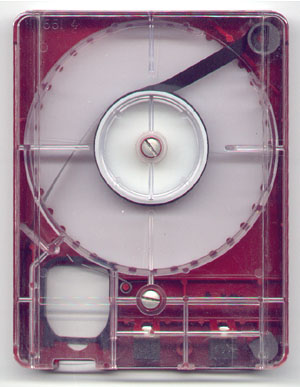
- Top view of a Fidelipac cartridge
- Media type: Magnetic tape cartridge
- Encoding: Analog signal
- Read mechanism: Tape head
- Write mechanism: Magnetic recording head
- Usage: audio playback
- Released: 1952; 74 years ago

The Fidelipac, commonly known as a "NAB cartridge" or simply "cart", is a magnetic tape sound recording format, used for radio broadcasting for playback of material over the air such as radio commercials, jingles, station identifications, and music, and for indoor background music. Fidelipac is the official name of this industry standard audio tape cartridge. It was developed in 1954 by inventor George Eash (although the invention of the Fidelipac cartridge has also been credited to Vern Nolte of the Automatic Tape Company), and commercially introduced in 1959 by Collins Radio Co. at the 1959 NAB Convention. The cartridge was often used at radio stations until the late 1990s, when such formats as MiniDisc and computerized broadcast automation predominated.

== History ==
The Fidelipac cartridge was the first audio tape cartridge available commercially, based on the endless-loop tape cartridge design developed by Bernard Cousino in 1952, while Eash shared space in Cousino's electronics shop in the early 1950s. Instead of manufacturing the Fidelipac format himself after developing it, Eash decided to license it for manufacture to Telepro Industries, in Cherry Hill, New Jersey. Telepro then manufactured and marketed the format under the Fidelipac brand name.

== Tape format ==
Fidelipac was originally a 1/4-inch-wide (6.4 mm) analog recording tape, two-track format. One of the tracks was used for monaural program audio, and the other being used for a cue track to control the player, where either a primary cue tone was recorded to automatically stop the cart, a secondary tone was recorded to automatically re-cue the cart to the beginning of the cart's program material (in some models, two secondary tones, one after the program material, and one before it, were recorded to have the cart machine automatically fast-forward through any leftover blank tape at the end of a cart's program), or a tertiary tone, which was used by some players to trigger another cart player or another form of external equipment. Later versions used three tracks, two for stereo audio, and the third for the cue track.

The standard tape speed for Fidelipac carts used in the radio broadcasting industry is 7.5 ips, although some cart players and recorders can be set to record at other speeds, such as 3.75 (Harris and a couple of Broadcast Electronics) or 15 ips (most famous one is the Pacific Tomcat - only difference is instead of the 3 tracks being of equal size, the cue track is reduced to 8-track width and the two program track widths are increased).

== Cartridge format ==
Unlike the consumer-marketed 8-track cartridge developed in 1964 by Bill Lear which had the pinch roller integrated into the cartridge, the Fidelipac cartridge had a hole in the right-hand bottom front corner of the cartridge, where the pinch roller built into the player would swing up into place to hold the tape against the drive capstan. While later machines from ATC, ITC, Harris, and others had the pinch roller automatically engage the cartridge when the play button was pressed (the capstan motor was already running when the cart was inserted), early machines such as Sparta, Spot-matic, and others required the operator to also push or pull a separate lever to move the pinch roller into place before playback could begin. The 8-track cartridge tape speed was slower (3 3/4 ips compared to Fidelipac's 7 1/2 ips) and did not have adequate tape support pads, and thus was not "broadcast quality." The lower speed and narrower tracks in 8-track cartridges led to higher noise and reduced frequency response. The 8-track design also lacked a cue track.

There were four sizes of Fidelipac carts available:

- the inch-wide by two-inch long AA (single) size, capable of carrying the same material as a 45 RPM EP (six minutes per track),
- the 4-inch-wide A size (Fidelipac Model 300, 350 and MasterCart), which was a standard 8-track size cart with maximum 10 1/2 minute playing time at 7.5 ips (this was the most common and widely used size of Fidelipac cart),
- the 6-inch-wide B size (Fidelipac Model 600), a larger cartridge designed for holding longer programs,
- and the even larger 8-inch-wide C size (Fidelipac Model 1200), often used for background music applications like the Rowe Customusic.

The A size Fidelipac cartridge was later adapted by Earl "Madman" Muntz in partnership with George Eash in 1963 for his Stereo-Pak cartridge system (also known as a 4-track cartridge). Several instances of B-size and C-size carts were also produced for a limited time to accommodate 2, 3 or 4-LP sets on tape.

These differed in two ways — the number of tracks used (four in this case, with two played back at a time to provide a total of two programs of stereo audio), and the tape speed (3 3/4 ips—the same speed as 8-track cartridges, as opposed to Fidelipac's standard 7 1/2 ips). Unlike the Fidelipac players which used a stationary head, the Stereo-Pak system used a movable head to switch between the two programs (much like the 8-track format, which also used a movable head to select its four stereo programs).

== See also ==
- 4-track cartridge
- 8-track cartridge
