= GSO Capital Partners =

American hedge fund

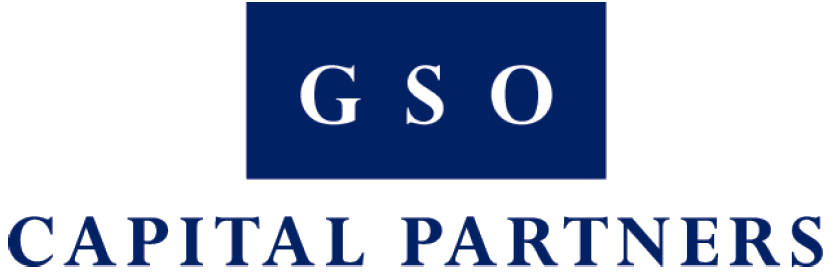
- Type: Subsidiary
- Industry: Financial services, asset management
- Founded: 2005; 21 years ago
- Founders: Bennett J. Goodman; J. Albert "Tripp" Smith; Doug Ostrover
- Defunct: November 2020; 5 years ago
- Fate: GSO branding dropped and changed to Blackstone Credit
- Headquarters: New York City, New York, U.S.
- Products: Mezzanine capital Leveraged finance Hedge funds Distressed investments
- Parent: Blackstone Inc.

GSO Capital Partners (GSO) was an American hedge fund and the credit investment arm of Blackstone. It was one of the largest credit-oriented alternative asset managers in the world and a major participant in the leveraged finance marketplace. The firm invested across a variety of credit oriented strategies and products including collateralized loan obligation vehicles investing in secured loans, hedge funds focused on special situations investments, mezzanine debt funds, and private equity funds focused on rescue financing.

It was acquired by Blackstone in March 2008. In November 2020, it was rebranded to Blackstone Credit.

== History ==
GSO was founded in 2005 by Bennett Jay Goodman, J. Albert Smith III, and Doug Ostrover. The GSO team had previously managed the leveraged finance businesses at Donaldson, Lufkin & Jenrette and later Credit Suisse First Boston, after the acquisition of DLJ. The firm is named for its three founding partners Bennett Goodman, Tripp Smith, and Doug Ostrover who had previously worked together at Donaldson, Lufkin & Jenrette and later Credit Suisse First Boston.

In May 2007, GSO sold a minority stake in its business to Merrill Lynch.

The following year, in March 2008, Blackstone acquired GSO for approximately $1 billion. Blackstone paid GSO $620 million in cash and stock and the GSO team also received an earnout worth up to $310 million through payable over the subsequent five years, based on certain earnings targets. Blackstone had existing relationships with the GSO team as an original investor in GSO's funds. The combination of Blackstone and GSO created one of the largest credit platforms in the alternative asset management business, with over $21 billion of total assets under management. Following the completion of the acquisition, Blackstone merged GSO's operations with its existing debt investment operations.

In July 2010, GSO announced the final closing of the Blackstone / GSO Capital Solutions Fund (the Fund) with total commitments of over $3.25 billion.

In March 2011, GSO acquired European collateralized loan obligation manager AIB Capital Markets which included four CLO vehicles worth more than €1.5 billion. GSO had previously acquired $3.1 billion of CLOs from Callidus Capital Management in 2010.

In November 2011, it was reported that GSO had raised over $2 billion for its newest mezzanine debt investment fund, making it one of the largest players in that market.

In March 2012, GSO raised $4 billion for its second mezzanine investment fund focused on middle-market companies.

In 2017, GSO accumulated $330 million in credit protection on US homebuilder Hovnanian Enterprises before making a deal to refinance its debt. In January 2018, a federal judge denied Solus Alternative Asset Management's request to stall the debt exchange, against GSO Capital Partners and Hovnanian Enterprises, explaining the firm provided "insufficient evidence of irreparable harm to them or the market." Solus Alternative Asset Management was attempting to temporarily block GSO and Hovnanian from completing their deal pending outcome of its suit.

On November 9, 2020 GSO was rebranded to Blackstone Credit.

== Investments ==
GSO invests across a variety of credit-oriented strategies.

- Leveraged finance — GSO is a leading provider of senior secured loans to middle market companies. The firm invests through various pools of capital including: Collateralized loan obligation (CLO) vehicles as well as other investment funds and accounts.
- Special Situations hedge fund — GSO's hedge funds invest in long/short credit, event-driven opportunities and distressed securities. These funds invest across a broad range of securities including secured loans, high yield debt, distressed securities, second lien loans, mezzanine debt as well as equity securities and credit derivatives.
- Mezzanine debt — GSO's Capital Opportunities Funds provide mezzanine capital as part of leveraged buyouts transactions, mergers and acquisitions and leveraged recapitalizations as well as for growth capital.
- Rescue Financing — GSO's Capital Solutions Funds provide private equity capital to companies needing liquidity or facing issues with their existing capital structures.
